= Chronological list of saints and blesseds in the 16th century =

A list of people, who died during the 16th century, who have received recognition as Blessed (through beatification) or Saint (through canonization) from the Catholic Church:

Name	Birth	Birthplace	Death	Place of death	Notes
Blessed Columba of Rieti	1467	Rieti, Umbria, Italy	1501		
Blessed Jerome Garibo	1440		1502		
Blessed Bernardino of Fossa	1420	Fossa, Italy	1503		
Blessed Louisa of Savoy	1461		1503		
Blessed Magdalen Panattieri	1443		1503		
Blessed Timothy of Montecchio	1414		1504		
Blessed Vincent of Aquila			1504		
Joan of Valois	1464		1505		
Blessed Ladislaus of Gielniow	1440		1505		
Blessed Margaret of Ravenna	1442		1505		
Blessed Osanna of Mantua	1449		1505		
Blessed John-Angelo Porro	1451		1506		
Blessed Antonia of Brescia	1407		1507		
Blessed Francis of Calderola			1507		
Francis of Paola	1416		1507		
Blessed Gratia of Kotor	1438		1508		
Blessed Jacopino de'Canepacci	1438		1508		
Catherine of Genoa	1477	Genoa, Italy	1510	Genoa, Italy	
Blessed Mark of Marconi	1480		1510		
Blessed John Liccio			1511		
Blessed Margaret Fontana	1440	Modena, Italy	1513	Italy	
Blessed Paula Montaldi	1443		1514		
Joseph of Volokolamsk			1515		
Blessed Paula Gambara-Costa	1473		1515		
Blessed Hans Wagner			1516		
Blessed Giles of Lorenzana	1443		1518		
Blessed Elena Duglioli	1472	Bologna, Italy	1520	Bologna, Italy	
		Beginning of Protestant Reformation			
Blessed Domenico Spadafora			1521		
Blessed Margaret of Lorraine	1463		1521		
Blessed Michael Pini	1450		1522		
Blessed Baptista Varani	1458		1527		
Blessed Margareta Kratz	1430	Scharfenstein, Germany	1532		
Blessed Louisa Albertoni	1473		1533		
Augustine Webster			1535		
John Fisher	1469		1535		Bishop of Rochester
John Houghton			1535		
Richard Reynolds	1492		1535		
Robert Lawrence			1535		
Thomas More	1478		1535		
Blessed John Haile (or Hale)			1535		Rector of St. Dunstan's Church, Cranford, London
Blessed Laurence of Villamagna	1476		1535		
Blessed Sebastian Newdigate			1535		
Blessed William Exmew			1535		
Blesseds Humphrey Middlemore			1535		
Gerolamo Emiliani	1481	Venice, Italy	1537	Somasca, Italy	
Blessed John Davy			1537		
Blessed Richard Bere			1537		
Blessed Robert Salt			1537		
Blessed Thomas Johnson			1537		
Blessed Walter Pierson			1537		
Blessed William Greenwood			1537		
Blesseds John Rochester and James Walworth			1537		
Blessed Thomas Green			1537		
John Stone			1539		
Blessed John Forest	1473		1538		
Anthony Maria Zaccaria	1502		1539		
Blessed Adrian Fortescue	1476		1539		
Blessed Hugh Cook Faringdon			1539		
Blessed John Baptist of Fabriano	1469		1539		
Blessed John Beche (Thomas Marshall)			1539		
Blessed John Eynon			1539		
Blessed John Rugg			1539		
Blessed John Thorne			1539		
Blessed Richard Whiting	1460		1539		
Blessed Roger James			1539		
Angela Merici	1470		1540		
Blessed Carthusian Martyrs			1540		
Blessed Edward Powell			1540		
Blessed Richard Fetherston			1540		
Blessed Thomas Abel			1540		
Blessed William Horne			1540		
Blessed David Gonson			1541		
Blessed Margaret Pole	1473		1541		
Blessed Christina of Aquila			1543		
Blessed Lucy of Narni	1476		1544		
Blesseds John Larke			1544		
Blessed Peter Favre	1506		1546		
Cajetan	1480		1547		
Blessed Catherine of Racconigi	1486		1547		
Blessed Philippa of Gheldre	1462		1547		
Juan Diego	1474		1548		
John of God	1495		1550		
Francis Xavier	1506		1552		
Thomas of Villanova	1488		1555		Bishop of Valencia
Ignatius of Loyola	1491		1556		
Peter of Alcantara	1499		1562		
Blessed John Marinoni	1490		1562		
Blessed Osanna of Cattaro	1493		1565		
Blessed John Armero			1566		
Salvatore of Orta	1520		1567		
Stanislaus Kostka	1550		1568		
John of Avila			1569		
Blessed Alphonsus de Vaena			1570		
Blessed Ignatius de Azevedo and Companions			1570		
Blessed Joanninus de San Juan			1570		
Blessed John Felton			1570		
Blessed John Fernandez			1570		
Blessed Thomas Plumtree			1570		
Blessed John Story			1571		
Adrian Van Hilvarenbeek			1572		
Andrew Wouters			1572		
Cornelius			1572		
Francis Borgia	1510		1572		
Francis Rod			1572		
Godfrey of Duynen			1572		
Godfrey of Merville			1572		
James Lacop			1572		
John of Cologne			1572		
John of Osterwick			1572		
Leonard Wegel (Veckel, Wickel)			1572		
Martyrs of Gorkum			1572		
Nicasius Jonson			1572		
Nicholas Pieck			1572		
Nicholas Poppel			1572		
Peter of Asche (Peter van Asche)			1572		
Pius V	1504		1572		pope
Theodoric of Emden			1572		
Willehad of Denmark	1482		1572		
Blessed Thomas Percy	1528		1572		
Blessed Thomas Woodhouse			1573		
Catherine of Palma	1533		1574		
Cuthbert Mayne (Maine)	1544		1577		
Blessed Mary Bartholomea of Florence			1577		
Blessed John Nelson	1534		1578		
Blessed Thomas Sherwood	1551		1578		
Blassed Alexander Briant	1556		1581		
Edmund Campion	1540	London, England	1581	Tyburn, England	
Louis Bertrand	1526		1581		
Ralph Sherwin			1581		
Blessed Everald Hanse			1581		
Blessed Patrick Cavanagh and Companions			1581		
John Payne (Paine)			1582		
Luke Kirby	1549		1582		
Teresa of Avila	1515		1582		
Blessed James Thompson			1582		
Blessed John Shert			1582		
Blessed Lawrence Richardson			1582		
Blessed Richard Kirkman			1582		
Blessed Robert Johnson			1582		
Blessed Thomas Cottam	1549		1582		
Blessed Thomas Ford			1582		
Blessed William Filby			1582		
Blessed William Lacey			1582		
Blessed John Bodey			1583		
Blessed John Slade			1583		
Blessed Nicholas of Factor	1520		1583		
Blessed Richard Thirkeld			1583		
Blessed William Hart			1583		
Blesseds Rudolph Acquaviva, Alphonsus Pacheco, Peter Berno, Anthony Francis, and Francis Aranha			1583		
Charles Borromeo	1538		1584		Bishop of Milan
Richard Gwyn (Richard White)	1537		1584		
Blessed Dermot O'Hurley	1519		1584		
Blessed George Haydock	1556		1584		
Blessed James Fenn	1540		1584		
Blessed John Finch			1584		
Blessed John Munden	1543		1584		
Blessed John Nutter			1584		
Blessed Margaret (Eleanor) Ball			1584		
Blessed Thomas Hemerford			1584		
Blessed William Carter	1548		1584		
Blessed Hugh Taylor	1560		1585		
Blessed Marmaduke Bowes			1585		
Blessed Maurice MacKenraghty			1585		
Blessed Thomas Alfield			1585		
Margaret Clitherow	1555		1586		
Blessed Edward Stransham	1557		1586		
Blessed John Adams	1543		1586		
Blessed John Sandys			1586		
Blessed Nicholas Woodfen (Wheeler)			1586		
Blessed Richard Langley			1586		
Blessed Robert Dibdale	1558		1586		
Blessed William Thomson	1560		1586		
Blesseds John Fingley and Robert Bickerdike			1586		
Blesseds Robert Anderson and William Marsden			1586		
Felix of Cantalice	1513		1587		
Blessed Bernard Scammacca	1430		1587		
Blessed George Douglas			1587		
Blessed John Hambley	1560		1587		
Margaret Ward			1588		
Ralph Crockett ",			1588		
Richard Martin			1588		
Blessed Christopher Buxton			1588		
Blessed Edward Burden	1540		1588		
Blessed Edward Campion			1588		
Blessed Edward James			1588		
Blessed Edward Shelley			1588		
Blessed Henry Webley	1558		1588		
Blessed Hugh More	1563		1588		
Blessed James Claxton			1588		
Blessed John Robinson			1588		
Blessed John Roche			1588		
Blessed Nicholas Garlick	1555		1588		
Blessed Richard Flower			1588		
Blessed Richard Leigh			1588		
Blessed Richard Martin			1588		
Blessed Robert Morton			1588		
Blessed Robert Sutton	1545		1588		
Blessed Robert Widmerpool			1588		
Blessed Robert Wilcox			1588		
Blessed Thomas Felton	1567		1588		
Blessed Thomas Holford (Thomas Acton)			1588		
Blessed William Dean			1588		
Blessed William Guntei			1588		
Blessed William Hartley			1588		
Blessed William Way			1588		
Benedict the Black (Benedict the Moor)	1526		1589		
Catherine de Ricci	1522		1589		
Blessed William Spenser and Robert Hardesty			1589		
Blesseds George Nichols, Richard Yaxley, Thomas Belson, and Humphrey Pritchard			1589		
Blesseds John Amias and Robert Dalby			1589		
Blessed Bartolomeu Fernandes dos Martires	1514		1590		
Blessed Christopher Bales	1564		1590		
Blessed Edmund Duke	1564		1590		
Blessed Francis Dickenson			1590		
Blessed Miles Gerard			1590		
Blessed Nicholas Horner			1590		
Blesseds Edward Jones and Antony Middleton			1590		
Blesseds Richard Hill, John Hogg, and Richard Holiday			1590		
Aloysius Gonzaga	1568		1591		
Edmund Genings, Eustace White, and Polydore Plasden, priests and martyrs (d. 1591), and Swithun Wells	1536		1591		
John of the Cross	1542		1591		
Martyrs of London	15821588		1591		
Polydore Plasden	1563		1591		
Blessed Alphonsus de Orozco	1500		1591		
Blessed George Beesley	1563		1591		
Blessed John Mason			1591		
Blessed Lawrence Humphrey			1591		
Blessed Ralph Milner and Roger Dickenson			1591		
Blessed Robert Thorpe			1591		
Blessed Sidney Hodgson			1591		
Blessed William Pike			1591		
Alexander Sauli	1534		1592		Bishop of Pavia
Paschal Baylon	1540		1592		
Blessed Thomas Pormort	1559		1592		
Blessed William Patenson			1592		
John Boste			1593		
Blessed Edward Waterson		London	1593 (OS)	Newcastle upon Tyne	
Blessed James Bird			1593		
Blessed William Davies			1593		
Blesseds James Sales and William Saultemouche	15567		1593		
Blessed Edward Osbaldeston	1560		1594		
Blessed John Carey			1594		
Blessed John Cornelius	1557		1594		
Blessed John Ingram	1565		1594		
Blessed John Speed			1594		
Blessed Patrick Salmon			1594		
Blessed Thomas Bosgrave			1594		
Blessed William Harrington	1566		1594		
Henry Walpole	1558		1595		
Philip Howard			1595		
Philip Neri	1515		1595		
Robert Southwell	1561		1595		
William Freeman			1595		
Blessed Alexander Rawlins			1595		
Blessed William Freeman	1558		1595		
Blesseds George Errington			1596		
Anthony Dainan			1597		
Bonaventure of Miako			1597		
Cosmas			1597		
Francis of St. Michael			1597		
James Kisai			1597		
John Soan de Goto			1597		
Leo Karasuma			1597		
Louis Ibarachi	1585		1597		
Martin de Aguirre			1597		
Martin Loynaz of the Ascension			1597		
Matthias of Meako			1597		
Michael Kozaki			1597		
Paulo Miki, priest and martyr, and Companions	1565		1597		
Peter Baptist			1597		
Peter Canisius	1521		1597		
Peter Shukeshiko			1597		
Peter Sukejiro			1597		
Philip of Jesus			1597		
Thomas Danki			1597		
Thomas Kozaki			1597		
Blessed Henry Abbot			1597		
Blessed Joseph of Anchieta	1534		1597		
Blessed Paul of Saint Mary			1597		
Blessed Edward Fulthrop			1597		
Blessed Thomas Warcop			1597		
Blessed William Andleby			1597		
John Jones/Buckley			1598		
Blessed Christopher Robinson			1598		
Blesseds Peter Snow and Ralph Grimston			1598		
Blessed Christopher Wharton			1600		
Blessed Edward Thwing (Thweng)	1565		1600		
Blessed John Grande	1546		1600		
John Rigby			1600		
Blessed Robert Nutter	1557		1600		
Blessed Sebastian Aparicio			1600		
Blesseds Thomas Hunt and Thomas Sprott			1600		
Blessed Thomas Palasor			1600		
Blessed John Talbot			1600		

== See also ==
- Christianity in the 16th century*
