= Eighty-five martyrs of England and Wales =

Group of men who were executed on charges of treason

George Haydock and Eighty-four Companion Martyrs
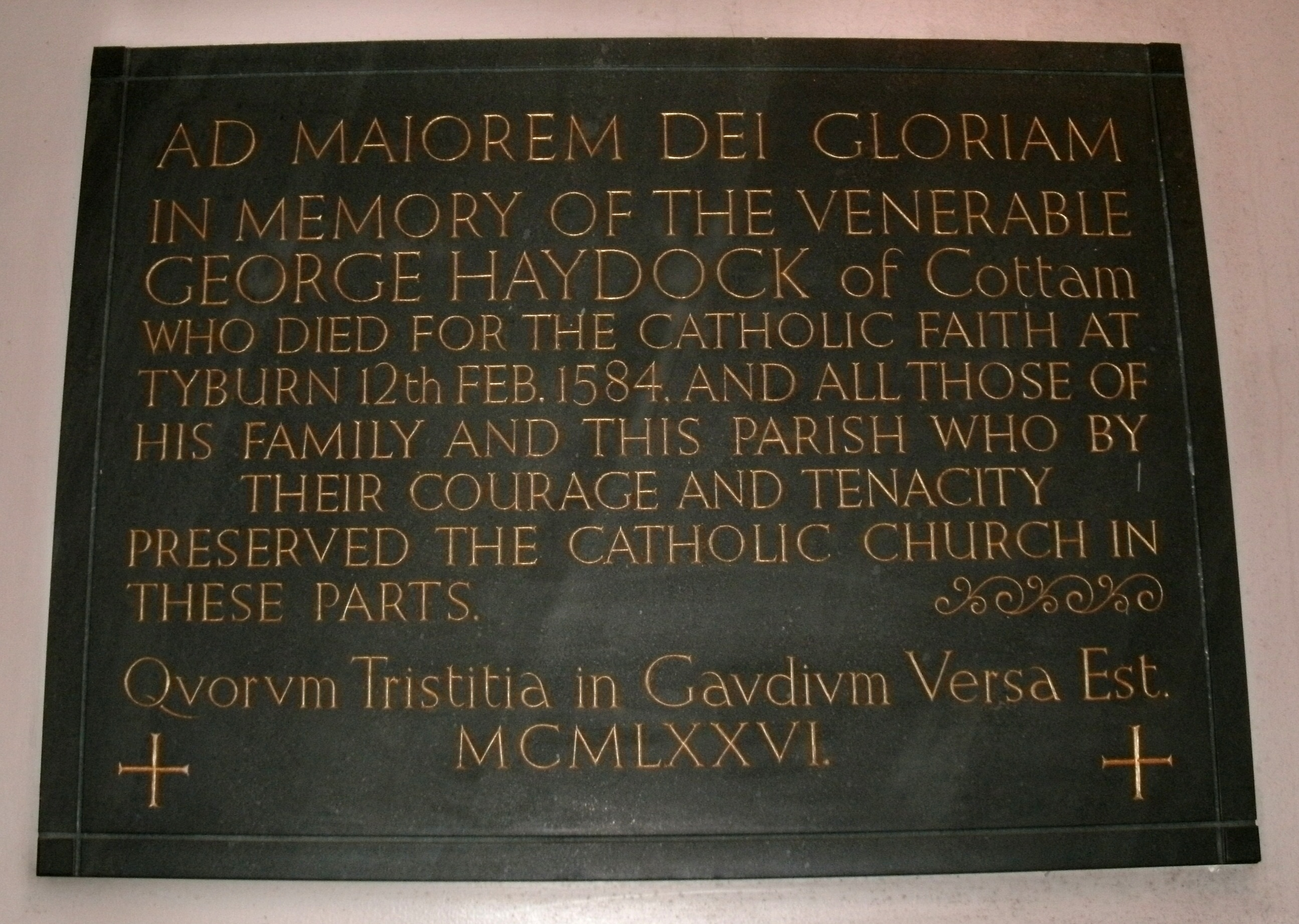
- Plaque honouring Haydock in the church of St. Andrew's & Blessed George Haydock, Cottam, Lancashire.
- Died: Between 11 January 1584 (William Carter (martyr)) - 12 August 1679 (Charles Mahoney), within England and Wales
- Venerated in: Roman Catholic Church
- Beatified: 22 November 1987, by Pope John Paul II
- Feast: 4 May, 22 November, various for individual martyrs
- Attributes: martyr's palm knife in chest noose in neck book or bible crucifix chaucible Eucharist various religious habits crown of martyrdom

The Eighty-five Martyrs of England and Wales, also known as George Haydock and Eighty-four Companion Martyrs, are a group of men who were executed on charges of treason and related offences in the Kingdom of England between 1584 and 1679. Of the eighty-five, seventy-five (sixty-one priests and fourteen laymen) were executed under the Jesuits, etc. Act 1584.

They are considered martyrs in the Roman Catholic Church and were beatified on 22 November 1987 by Pope John Paul II.

== List of individual names ==
They were chosen from a number of priests and laymen executed between 1584 and 1679.

Diocesan Clergy

1. George Haydock (c. 1549 - 12 February 1584)
2. Hugh Taylor (c. 1559 - 26 November 1585)
3. Nicholas Woodfen (Wheeler) (c. 1550 - 21 January 1586)
4. Richard Sergeant (c. 1558 - 20 April 1586)
5. William Thomson (c. 1560 - 20 April 1586)
6. Francis Ingleby (c. 1550 or 1551 - 3 June 1586)
7. John Fingley (c. 1553 - 8 August 1586)
8. John Sandys (c. 1552 - 11 August 1586)
9. John Lowe (c. 1553 - 8 October 1586)
10. John Adams (c. 1543 - 8 October 1586)
11. Robert Dibdale (c. 1558 - 8 October 1586)
12. Alexander Crow (c. 1550 or 1551 - 30 November 1586)
13. Thomas Pilchard (Pilcher) (c. 1557 - 21 March 1587)
14. Edmund Sykes (c. 1550 - 23 March 1587)
15. John Hambley (c. 1560 - 29 March 1587)
16. Stephen Rowsham (c. 1555 - 3 April 1587)
17. George Douglas (c. 1540 - 9 September 1587)
18. Nicholas Garlick (c. 1555 - 24 July 1588)
19. Robert Ludlam (c. 1551 - 24 July 1588)
20. Richard Simpson (c. 1554 - 24 July 1588)
21. Robert Sutton (c. 1543 or 1545 - 27 July 1587)
22. Edward Burden (c. 1540 - 31 October 1588)
23. George Nichols (c. 1550 - 5 July 1589)
24. Richard Yaxley (c. 1560 - 5 July 1589)
25. William Spenser (c. 1555 - 24 September 1589)
26. Edmund Duke (c. 1563 - 27 May 1590)
27. Richard Hill (c. 1565 - 27 May 1590)
28. John Hogg (c. 1565 - 27 May 1590)
29. Richard Holiday (c. 1565 - 27 May 1590)
30. Robert Thorpe (c. 1560 - 31 May 1591)
31. Montford Scott (c. 1550 - 2 July 1591)
32. George Beesley (c. 1562 - 2 July 1591)
33. Thomas Pormort (c. 1560 - 20 February 1592)
34. Joseph Lambton (c. 1568 - 24 July 1592)
35. Anthony Page (died 20 or 30 April 1593)
36. William Davies (c. 1558 or 1560 - 27 July 1593)
37. Edward Osbaldeston (c. 1560 - 16 November 1594)
38. Christopher Robinson (c. 1568 - 19 August 1598)
39. Peter Snow (c. 1564 - 15 June 1598)
40. Christopher Wharton (c. 1540 - 28 March 1600)
41. Thomas Sprott (Parker) (c. 1571 - 1 July 1600)
42. Thomas Hunt (Benstead) (c. 1573 - 1 July 1600)
43. Edward Thwing (c. 1565 - 26 July 1600)
44. Thomas Palasor (c. 1570 - 9 August 1600)
45. Thurston Hunt (Greenlow) (c. 1555 - 31 March 1601)
46. John Sugar (Cox) (c. 1558 - 16 July 1604)
47. Robert Drury (c. 1568 - 26 February 1607)
48. Matthew Flathers (c. 1560 - 21 March 1608)
49. Roger Cadwallador (c. 1566 - 27 August 1610)
50. Thomas Atkinson (c. 1545 - 11 March 1616)
51. John Thules (Thulis or Thewlis) (c. 1568 - 18 March 1616)
52. William Southerne (c. 1569 - 30 April 1618)
53. Edward Bamber (Helmes or Reding) (c. 1600 - 7 August 1646)
54. Thomas Whittaker (Starkie) (c. 1611 or 1613 - 7 August 1646)
55. Nicholas Postgate (c. 1597 - 7 August 1679)

Roman Catholic Laity

1. William Carter (c. 1549 - 11 January 1584)
2. Marmaduke Bowes (died 26 November 1585)
3. Robert Bickerdike (died probably 23 July 1586)
4. Henry Webley (died 22 August 1588)
5. Richard Flower (c. 1566 - 30 August 1588)
6. William Lampley (died 1 August 1588)
7. Thomas Belson (c. 1564 - 5 July 1589)
8. Humphrey Pritchard (died 5 July 1589)
9. Robert Hardesty (died 24 September 1589)
10. Nicholas Horner (died 4 March 1590)
11. Alexander Blake (died 4 March 1590)
12. Thomas Watkinson (died 31 May 1591)
13. William Pike (died 22 December 1591)
14. George Errington (c. 1554 - 29 November 1596)
15. William Knight (c. 1573 - 29 November 1596)
16. William Gibson (died 29 November 1596)
17. John Bretton (c. 1527 - 1 April 1598)
18. Ralph Grimston (died 15 June 1598)
19. John Norton (died 9 August 1600)
20. John Talbot (died 9 August 1600)
21. Robert Grissold (c. 1575 - 16 July 1604)
22. Roger Wrenno (c. 1576 - 18 March 1616)

Franciscan Friars Minor (Recollects)

1. Thomas Bullaker (John Baptist) (c. 1603 or 1604 - 12 October 1642)
2. Henry Heath (Paul of Saint Magdalene) (c. 1599 or 1600 - 17 April 1643)
3. Arthur Bell (Francis) (13 January 1590 – 11 December 1643)
4. John Woodcock (Martin of Saint Felix) (c. 1603 - 7 August 1646)
5. Charles Meehan (Mahoney) (c. 1640 - 12 August 1679)

Society of Jesus (Jesuits)

1. Roger Filcock (Arthur Naylor) (c. 1572 - 27 February 1601)
2. Robert Middleton (c. 1571 - 31 March 1601)

Order of Preachers (Dominicans)

1. Robert Nutter (Askew or Rowley) (c. 1557 - 26 July 1600)

== Liturgical Feast Day ==
In England, these martyrs, together with those beatified between 1886 and 1929, are commemorated by a feast day on 4 May. This day also honours the Forty Martyrs of England and Wales who hold the rank of saint; the Forty Martyrs were honoured separately on 25 October until the liturgical calendar for England was revised in the year 2000.

In Wales, 4 May specifically commemorates the beatified martyrs of England and Wales. Five of the martyrs named in this group of 85, Three – William Davies, Humphrey Pritchard (or Humphrey ap Richard) and Charles Mahoney – have Welsh connections, and two – William Gibson and George Douglas – have Scottish connections. In the Welsh calendar, 25 October is still kept as a distinct feast of the 'Six Welsh Martyrs and their companions', as the Forty canonised Martyrs are known in Wales.

== Historical context and treason accusations ==
Queen Elizabeth I was excommunicated by Pope Pius V, on 25 February 1570, creating a situation full of perplexity for English Roman Catholics. Once this declaration was made, a number of Catholics acted on it, and a number, under the influence of Spanish ambassador Bernardino de Mendoza and others, were implicated in plots against Elizabeth which were undoubtedly treasonable from the English Government's point of view. That a certain party of English Catholics was in rebellion against Elizabeth is not disputed. Thus William Allen, with many of the exiles of Douai and Louvain, and Robert Persons, with many of the Jesuits, saw in the rule of Elizabeth a greater danger to the highest interests of England than had previously been threatened in cases where history had justified the deposition of kings. And the supreme authority had sanctioned this view.

In the eyes of Elizabeth and her ministers, such opposition was nothing less than high treason. But a large number of English Catholics refused to go so far as rebellion. As John Lingard writes:

Among the English Catholics (the bull) served only to breed doubts, dissensions, and dismay. Many contended that it had been issued by an incompetent authority; others that it could not bind the natives till it should be carried into actual execution by some foreign power; all agreed that it was in their regard an imprudent and cruel expedient, which rendered them liable to the suspicion of disloyalty, and afforded their enemies a presence to brand them with the name of traitors.

The next pope, Gregory XIII, on 14 April 1580 issued a declaration that although Elizabeth and her abettors remained subject to the excommunication, it was not to be binding on Catholics to their detriment. The majority of English Roman Catholics then did not give the royal government grounds for suspecting their loyalty, but they persisted in the practice of their religion, which was made possible only by the coming of the seminary priests. After the Northern Rising, Parliament had passed a statute (the Bulls, etc., from Rome Act 1571) declaring it to be high treason to put into effect any papal bull of absolution to absolve or reconcile any person to the Church of Rome, to be absolved or reconciled, or to procure or publish any papal bull or writing whatsoever. Purely religious acts were declared by Parliament to be treasonable.

Elizabeth's government, for its own purposes, refused to make any distinction between Catholics who had been engaged in open opposition to the Queen and those who were forced by conscience to ignore the provisions of this statute of 1571. All were purposely identified by the government and treated as one for controversial purposes.

This view was put forward officially in a pamphlet by William Cecil, Lord Burghley:

The Execution of Justice in England for maintenance of public and Christian peace, against certain stirrers of sedition and adherents to the traitors and enemies of the realm without any persecution of them for questions of religion, as is falsely reported, and published by the fautors and fosterers of their treasons.

In it, Burghley gave no credit to Catholic priests risking their lives for any religious purpose, but opined "the seminary fugitives come secretly into the realm to induce the people to obey the Pope's bull."

Under the Jesuits, etc. Act 1584, it became high treason for any seminary priest, or any Jesuit, simply to come to England; and felony for any person to harbour or relieve them. Burghley insists that before the excommunication no one had been charged with capital crimes on the ground of religion, and brings everything back to the question of the bull. The pamphlet ends by proposing six questions or tests by which traitors might be distinguished from simple scholars (the so-called "bloody questions").

== Contemporary controversy ==
William Allen, in his Answer to the Libel of English Justice published in 1584, joined issue on all points, stating "that many priests and other Catholics in England have been persecuted, condemned and executed for mere matter of religion and for transgression only of new statutes which make cases of conscience to be treason without all pretence or surmise of any old treasons or statutes for the same". He defended Edmund Campion and the other martyrs from the imputation of treason.

== See also ==
- Catholic Church in England and Wales
- Irish Catholic Martyrs
- Forty Martyrs of England and Wales
- List of Catholic martyrs of the English Reformation
- Marian Persecutions
- Oxford Martyrs
