= Edmund Duke =

Edmund Duke is the name of:

- Edmund Duke (priest) (1563–1590), English priest and Catholic martyr
- Edmund Duke (StarCraft), a fictional general in the StarCraft series
