= William Gibson (martyr) =

- Born: 1548, Fife, Scotland
- Died: 29 November 1596, York, England
- Martyred by: Queen Elizabeth I of England
- Means of martyrdom: Hanging, drawing and quartering
- Venerated in: Great Britain
- Beatified: 22 November 1987, London, England, by Pope John Paul II
- Feast: 4 May

William Gibson (1548 – 29 November 1596) was a layman from Ripon in Yorkshire, England, a member of a noble Scottish family, who was executed at York for professing the Roman Catholic faith. He is honoured as a martyr by the Catholic Church.

With him also suffered George Errington of Herst, Northumberland; William Knight of South Duffield and (after a short reprieve) Henry Abbot of Howden, also in Yorkshire.

== Life ==
Gibson was the son of Lord George Gibson II (+1590) of Goldingstones, Fife, Scotland, a judge of the High Court of Scotland, who was a "free baron" under charter of King James IV of Scotland. His great-uncle and namesake, Bishop William Gibson, Dean of Restalrig, had been one of the leading Catholic clergymen in Scotland prior to the Scottish Reformation. He frequently represented King James V to the Holy See, and, with the support of Cardinal David Beaton, his writings in defence of the Catholic faith had earned him the papal title of "Guardian of the Scottish Church" (Latin: Custos Ecclesiae Scotiae).

The younger William Gibson was accused of treason for being a Catholic and denounced to the authorities. He was at once seized and committed to the custody of a pursuivant, Roger Colyer, who treated him with indignity and severity.

Gibson was sent in August 1593 to York Castle, where he was joined shortly thereafter by fellow future martyrs William Knight and George Errington, both arrested for participation in a rising.

A certain Anglican clergyman chanced to be among their fellow prisoners. To gain his freedom he had recourse to an act of treachery: feigning a desire to become a Roman Catholic, he won the confidence of Gibson and his two companions, who explained their faith to him. With the connivance of the authorities, he was directed to Henry Abbot, then at liberty, who endeavoured to procure a priest to reconcile him to the Catholic Church. When the clergyman had sufficient evidence, Gibson was arrested and, together with Knight and his two comrades, accused of attempting to persuade the clergyman to embrace Catholicism — an act of treason under the English Penal Laws. They were all found guilty, before (with the exception of Abbot, who was executed later) suffering hanging, drawing and quartering at York on 29 November 1596.

Gibson was one of the Eighty-five martyrs of England and Wales beatified by Pope John Paul II on 22 November 1987 in the course of a visit to the United Kingdom.

== See also ==
- Patrick Hamilton (martyr)
- George Wishart
- List of Protestant martyrs of the Scottish Reformation
- Saint John Ogilvie
- Forty Martyrs of England and Wales
- List of Catholic martyrs of the English Reformation
- John Black (martyr)
- George Douglas (martyr)
- John Ingram (martyr)
- Patrick Primrose
- Hugh Barclay of Ladyland, David Graham, Laird of Fintry, Spanish blanks plot
- Alexander Cameron (priest)
