= John Ogilvie (saint) =

16th and 17th-century Scottish Jesuit saint and martyr

Saint John Ogilvie SJ
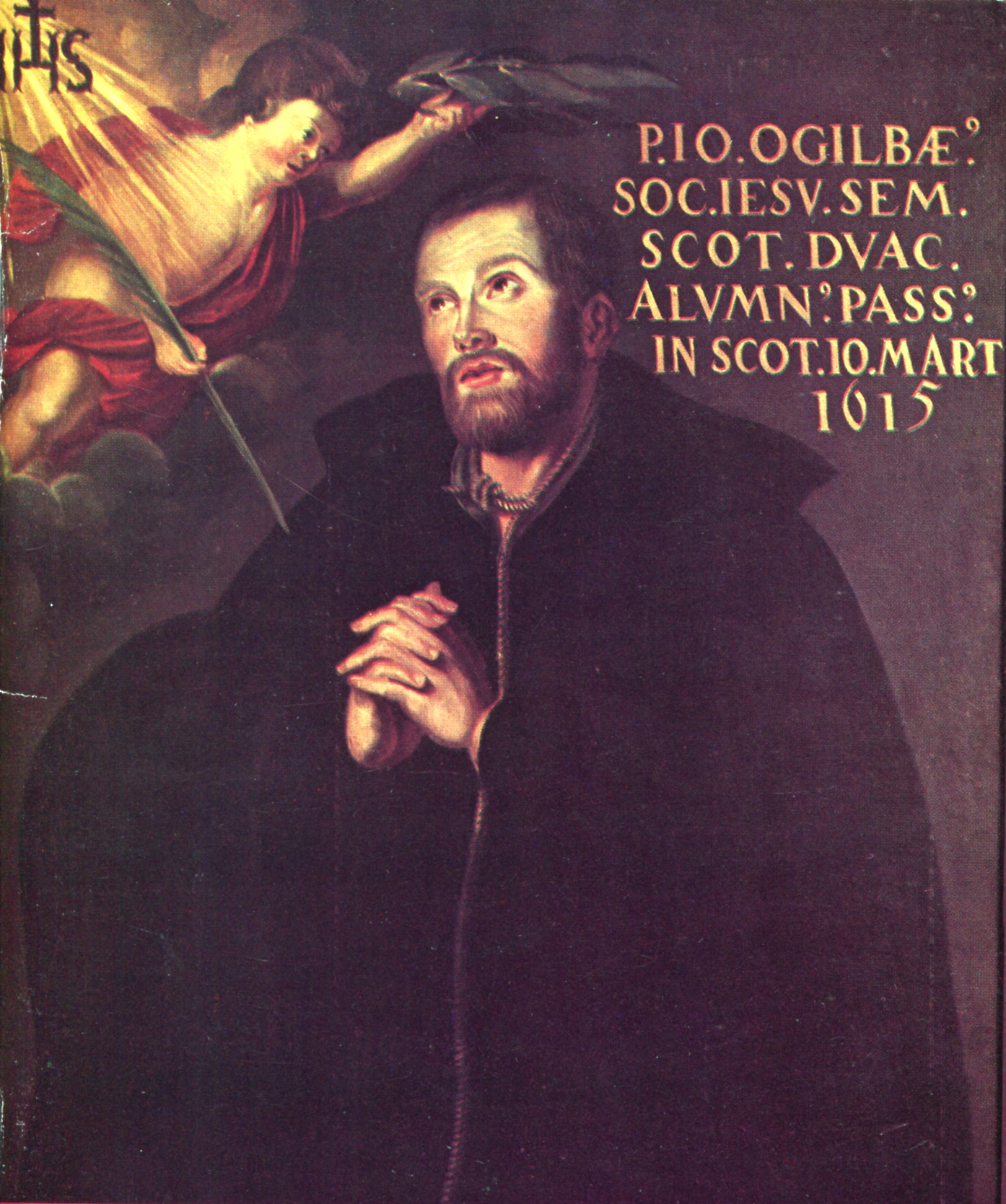
- John Ogilvie

Martyr
- Born: 1580; Drumnakeith, Banffshire, Scotland
- Died: 10 March 1615 (aged 34–35); Glasgow Cross, Scotland
- Cause of death: Execution by Hanging
- Venerated in: Catholic Church
- Beatified: 22 December 1929, Rome, Vatican City by Pius XI
- Canonized: 17 October 1976, Rome, Vatican City by Paul Vl
- Feast: 10 March

John Ogilvie, SJ (1580 – 10 March 1615) was a Scottish Jesuit priest. For his service to persecuted Catholics in 17th-century Scotland and his murder due to his faith, he was canonized in 1976. As of 2026, he is the only post-Reformation Scottish saint.

Ogilvie was brought up a Calvinist and sent to continental Europe to further his education. His interest piqued by the popular debates going on between Catholic and Calvinist scholars, he took up studies with the Benedictines and then with the Jesuits. He became a Jesuit and was sent to Scotland, where he worked among the few Catholics in the area of Glasgow. Arrested after less than a year, he was hanged at Glasgow Cross in 1615.

== Biography ==
John was the eldest son of Walter Ogilvie, a respected Calvinist who owned the estate of Drumnakeith in Banffshire. His family was partly Roman Catholic and partly Presbyterian. At the age of twelve he was sent to continental Europe to be educated. He attended a number of Catholic educational establishments, under the Benedictines at Regensburg in Germany and with the Jesuits at Olmutz and Brunn in Moravia.

In the midst of the religious controversies and turmoil that engulfed the Europe of that era, he decided to become a Catholic. In 1597, aged seventeen, he was received into the Catholic Church by Cornelius a Lapide S.J., professor of sacred scripture at Leuven, Belgium. Ogilvie joined the Society of Jesus in 1599 and was ordained a priest at Paris in 1613. After ordination he served in Rouen in Normandy where he made repeated requests to be sent to Scotland to minister to the few remaining Catholics in the Glasgow area. (After the Scottish Reformation in 1560 it had become illegal there to preach, proselytise for, or otherwise endorse Catholicism.)

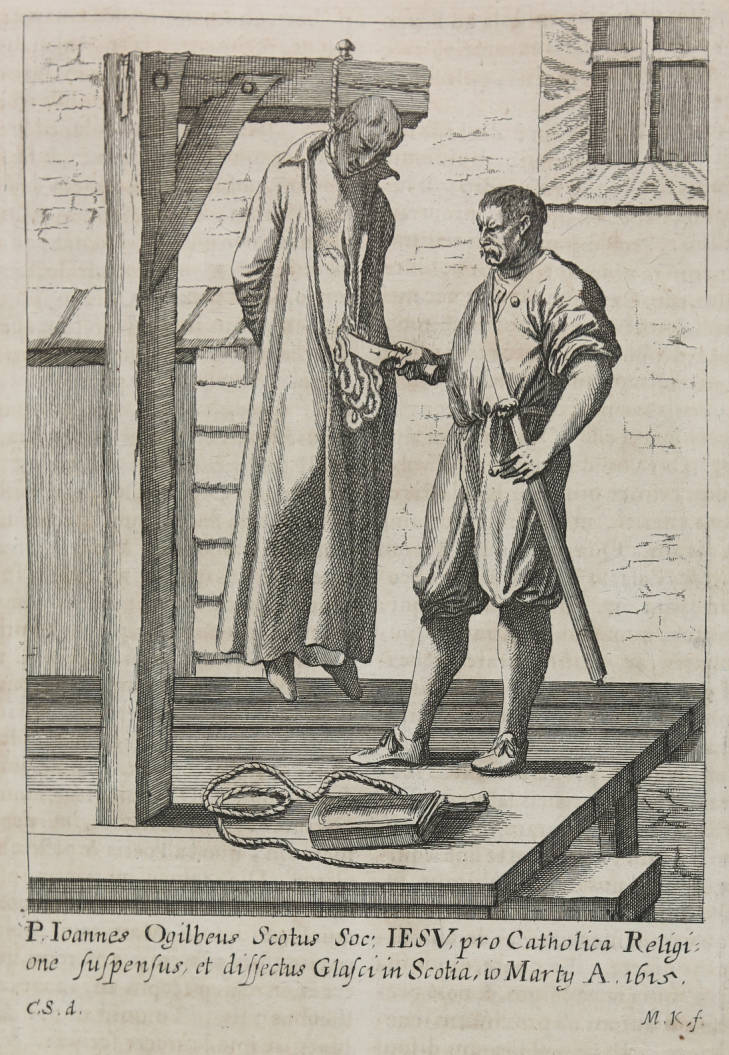
The Jesuit John Ogilvie, who was publicly hanged and drawn on 10 March 1615 in Glasgow

It was his hope that some Catholic nobles there would aid him, given his lineage. Finding none, he went to London, then back to Paris, and finally returned to Scotland in November 1613 disguised as a horse trader named John Watson. Thereafter he began to preach in secret, offering Mass clandestinely in private homes. This ministry was to last less than a year. In October 1614, Ogilvie was discovered and arrested in Glasgow under the orders of Archbishop John Spottiswood, and was imprisoned. He was initially treated well, but after continually refusing to confess, was tortured by sleep deprivation. He aggravated his position by refusing to pledge allegiance to the royal authority of King James over the Church within his dominions, and it was for this alleged crime that Fr. Ogilvie was tried. During the trial he criticised the King for 'playing the runagate from God' and stated he would acknowledge his authority over the Church no more than the authority of an 'old hat'. Found guilty, Fr. Ogilvie was hanged at Glasgow Cross on 10 March 1615, aged thirty-six.

Ogilvie's last words were: "If there be here any hidden Catholics, let them pray for me but the prayers of heretics I will not have." After he was pushed from the stairs, he threw his concealed rosary out into the crowd. According to legend, one of his enemies caught it and subsequently became a devout, lifelong Catholic. After his execution Ogilvie's followers were rounded up and put in jail. They suffered heavy fines, but none received the death penalty.

The customary beheading and quartering were omitted owing to undisguised popular sympathy, and his body was hurriedly buried in the churchyard of Glasgow cathedral.

== Veneration and legacy ==
As a martyr of the Reformation and the Counter-Reformation, he was declared Venerable in the seventeenth century. Ogilvie was beatified in 1929. The miraculous cure from stomach cancer of John Fagan, a former Glasgow docker, was attributed to the intercession of Ogilvie, leading to his canonisation on 17 October 1976, becoming the only post-Reformation Scottish saint. His feast day is celebrated on 10 March by the Catholic Church in Scotland. In the rest of the world it is celebrated on 14 October. The Jesuit church of St Aloysius, Glasgow is home to the national shrine of St John Ogilvie.

There are a number of churches and institutions dedicated to Ogilvie. There are several churches in the central belt of Scotland, including Blantyre, Glasgow and Edinburgh, as well as three primary schools and a high school. In the Highlands there is a Parish of Saint John Ogilvie comprising the Churches of Saint Joseph’s in Invergordon and Saint Vincent De Paul’s in Tain. At the service to mark the quadricentenary of his death, he was described as "Scotland's only Catholic martyr". In Corby, Northamptonshire — an English town with a strong Scottish heritage — a Catholic church registered in March 1980 is dedicated to John Ogilvie.

Ogilvie's trial and execution was the subject of Donald Campbell's first play The Jesuit (1976), which was performed at Edinburgh's Traverse Theatre.

== See also ==
- George Wishart
- List of Protestant martyrs of the Scottish Reformation
- Forty Martyrs of England and Wales
- List of Catholic martyrs of the English Reformation
- John Black (martyr)
- George Douglas (martyr)
- William Gibson (martyr)
- John Ingram (martyr)
- Patrick Primrose
- Hugh Barclay of Ladyland, David Graham, Laird of Fintry, Spanish blanks plot
- Alexander Cameron (priest)
- Saint John Ogilvie, patron saint archive

== Sources ==
- Barrett, Michael (1913). "Ven. John Ogilvie". In Herbermann, Charles (ed.). Catholic Encyclopedia. New York: Robert Appleton Company.
- Smith, George Gregory (1885–1900). "Ogilvie, John (1580?-1615)" . Dictionary of National Biography. London: Smith, Elder & Co.
