= John Black (martyr) =

- Born: early 16th century
- Died: 9 March 1566, Edinburgh, Scotland
- Occupations: Dominican, Special Preacher to the Queen, Royal Confessor, Disputation, and Martyr

John Black OP (early 16th century – 9 March 1566) was a Roman Catholic Dominican serving as a recently named post-Tridentine special preacher, and confessor, to Mary, Queen of Scots when he was murdered on the same night as David Rizzio in Edinburgh.

== Early career ==
Black is thought to have been a member of an Aberdeen family. He was in the Dominican house in Aberdeen, where he was procurator, and moved to Edinburgh by 1558.

He was based in Edinburgh in 1559 when the Dominican church was burnt to the ground by violent Reformers.

In 1559, with the Queen Regent Mary of Guise at a mass in the Palace of Holyrood House, Archbishop Hamilton, the most senior cleric in Scotland, was in attendance. He deferred to Black when giving the sermon asking that he be excused because he "had not been weill exercised in that profession... [and] ... shewed unto them that there was a lerned man, meaning Fryer Blake, who wes to come immediately after him into the pulpit, who would declare unto them the trueth."

Black attended the Queen Regent on 7 May 1560 at Edinburgh Castle, shortly before her death on 10 June, according to John Knox's description of the Mass that followed celebration of the English defeat at the Siege of Leith by combined French and Scottish forces. Knox also records that Black was the Queen Regent's confessor.

== First assault of 1562 ==
In April 1562, Black was imprisoned by Edinburgh burgh council in the Tolbooth, and the council sent a letter to Mary, Queen of Scots, outlining his faults. Mary wrote back from St Andrews to assure the Provost of Edinburgh there would be a trial and they should transfer Black to custody in Edinburgh Castle.

Of the incident, the 20th-century Dominican historian Fr. Raymund Devas, OP, writing a history with an imprimatur, observes only that the burgh records for Edinburgh show that in "the spring of the year 1562, Fr. Black's enemies created an unpleasant disturbance in Edinburgh".

John Durkan described the case in overview, "The Edinburgh town council arrest him in the chapel royal in the act of delivering letters for posting abroad, apparently to Katherine Ewart or Ewing. A few days later they accuse her of adultery with Black. The Queen, however, sends a peremptory order demanding that Black be released from the Tolbooth and given over to the Castle authorities. There is a distinct impression, from the order of events, that Black's immorality is an afterthought, and that the burgh authorities were determined to lay hands on him at all costs. It is an impression deepened by the discovery that the lady impugned is the wife of the burgh treasurer. We have no record of the trial, but presumably, if one took place, it was for betraying official secrets to correspondents abroad."

Michael Lynch analysed these events of the Scottish Reformation in Edinburgh in more detail. The identified woman was "the divorced wife of a prominent Protestant merchant". John Weston had been "given his guildry by right of his wife, Katherine Ewart (Ewing), in 1549". He, again, "came onto the council six months later".

== Second assault of 1563 ==
Black was falsely reported dead after being stoned by a Protestant mob on 7 January 1563. As such, the event was described both by a contemporary in Edinburgh, the Senator of the College of Justice, David Chalmers, Lord Ormond, and near-contemporary Scottish Roman Catholic historian Thomas Dempster.

Consequently, that Black survived this attack escaped the attention of many historians. This is mirrored by a gap in the local contemporary Scottish historical record of Black's whereabouts. (See:#Diplomatic reports to the English Crown)

On 19 May 1563, Archbishop Hamilton and many other priests were on trial in Edinburgh for taking confessions and ministering Mass. The Queen obtained their release, but Black is not named amongst their number.

In 1565, two years after these events, Black is again on record in Scotland. At this point the Council of Trent had completed its sitting, and Black was appointed special preacher to the Queen at Holyroodhouse, the first such appointment in 7 years, and "in line with Tridentine decrees". Most pertinently regarding Black's character, the Council reaffirmed clerical celibacy and stood against concubinage, a state of life friars such as Black were already expected to be the best example of due to their itinerant vows of poverty. In the same year he was appointed Second Master of St Mary's College, St Andrews, and kept the position until murdered.

== 1566 assaults and death ==
Black was attacked on at least two occasions in 1566.

=== January assault ===
On 5 January he was seriously wounded in Edinburgh's Cowgate. He was stabbed in the back between his shoulders. Four craftsmen from Edinburgh were accused of attacking him; Andrew Armstrong, James Young, a cutler, William Johnston, a bower, Thomas Broune, a cordiner or shoemaker. William Johnston was found guilty because he had given Black's cloak to his colleague Richard, an arrow maker, the day after the assault.

As Lynch explains, "the full flavour of the first assault on Friar Black is not caught unless it is realised that the 'murder gang' included man who had been Burgh commissioner to the General Assembly and was the most influential Protestant craftsmen in Edinburgh in the 1560s". Noting this, Lynch explains: a "serious complaint... was... the inability of catholics to gain justice from civil magistrate".

The accused men were Protestant activists in Edinburgh, Jasper Ridley, a biographer of John Knox, characterised them as a "Protestant murder gang". Although the members of assize at the trials can be identified as Catholic sympathisers, most of the gang were acquitted.

However, as an example of the 'complex and confused record' in Pitcairn's summary: "an assize list for Armstrong had all those returning guilty verdicts, seven of the 13 members deleted and the whole list is marked 'absentes'". The security of the convictions were difficult: "it must either speak volumes for the fear of Armstrong's 'Protestant murder gang' or testify to a general desire of most conservatives in the 1560s to lie low". Armstrong had a history of drawn out proceedings in attacks against Catholics where no conviction was brought despite, for instance,"carrying pistols".

=== March murder ===
On 9 March Black was killed in his bed. On the same night David Rizzio was murdered at Holyrood Palace. The latter was killed by a group of Protestants in league with the then religiously wavering king consort Henry Stuart.

Within two years, the king consort Henry Stuart would himself be murdered.

Whilst there are official state records regarding the murder of Rizzio that even go so far as implicating John Knox and John Craig, there are no state records regarding the murder of Black.

The Spanish court was informed by the ambassador in London Diego Guzmán de Silva that Rizzio, her secretary, and Black, her confessor, had been murdered.

The murderous attacks on Rizzio and Black were summarised by historian Michael Lynch, as "having probably as many motives as there was conspirators".

Happening on the eve of a parliament that: acting upon the Council of Trent, would be discussing "allowing bishops and rectors the full exercise of their authority"; and would also bring about the trial of Chaseabout rebels at court, a sizable element of previous parliaments. Rumours circulated about the severity of both actions.

== Public disputation with Protestants ==
Black was known publicly for holding disputations with Protestant Reforming clergy. The first disputation is recorded as occurring in Holyrood Abbey, between 16 June and 20 July 1560, during William Cecil's visit to Edinburgh, corroborated by the later report of the English diplomat Thomas Randolph.

The second occurred in August 1561, shortly before the return of Mary Queen of Scots to Scotland. Black's opponent at this disputation was John Willock.

The questions posed at this disputation were described by John Lesley, Bishop of Ross, as, "Quhether the naturall body of Christ was really in the sacrament of the altar, be vertue of the wordis spokin be the priest or no? Quhether in the sacrament efter the wordis of consecration, war any uther substance than the substance of the body and bluid of Christ? Quhether in the Messe war a sacrifice proportionate for the sinnes of the quicke and the deid?" Black wrote an account of his disputation with Willock.

Another of Black's works, Conciones piae/Conciones doctissime pias (Patriotic Debates/Learned Patriotic Debates) attests of the frequency of these disputations.

== Diplomatic reports to the English Crown ==
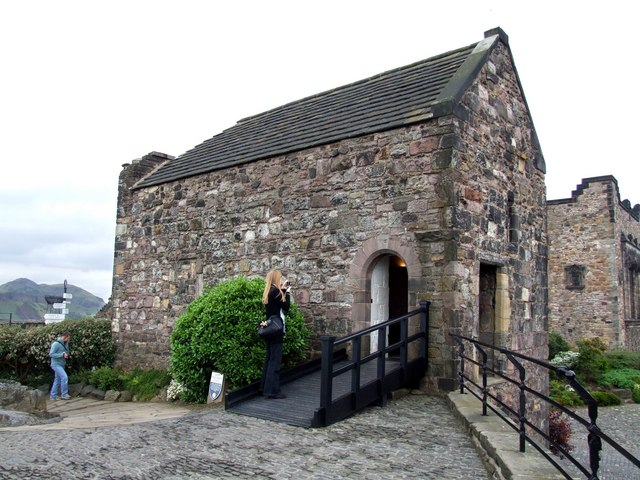
Thomas Randolph reported that John Black was banished from Scotland for misbehaving in Edinburgh Castle's small personal chapel royal of St. Margaret

In June 1563 the English diplomat Thomas Randolph described meeting a servant of John Black at St Andrews. He bribed the servant to show him Friar Black's correspondence and Randolph made copies. Randolph noted that Black had previously disputed with Protestants in Holyrood Abbey. Randolph mentioned that Friar Black had been banished from Scotland for adultery committed in the chapel of Edinburgh Castle. At this time, June 1563, according to Randolph, Black was in England serving the old Lady Percy. Lady Percy's husband was commonly regarded as a popular martyr, and her eldest son was beatified by the Pope.

The Earl of Bedford, an English diplomat stationed at Berwick reported the murders to William Cecil, writing, "at the same tyme was also slayne by like order, one Frier Blacke, a ranke Papiste, and a man of evill life, whose death was attempted by another before, and he stricken and sore hurte".

Thomas Randolph also wrote from Berwick with news of the murder. Randolph noted that Black was killed in his bed, and reminded Cecil of the older story, that Black had previously been banished from Scotland for adultery. Randolph also described the earlier assault in 1566, when his assailants attacked him at night armed with a cudgel and dagger.

== John Black and the early historians ==
John Lesley, Bishop of Ross, describes a public disputation between John Black and John Willock in the summer of 1561. They discussed the doctrines of transubstantiation and the Mass. Lesley thought the discussion only served to increase doubts in the minds of the audience. The Bishop of Ross was not one of the four prelates who formally rejected the adoption of Protestantism at the Scottish Reformation Parliament of 1560, not being consecrated until 1565, however, he never accepted Protestantism and was subsequently active in writing against it in publication.

The Catholic writer Thomas Dempster, followed Lesley, but gave a more generous notice of Black as an eloquent speaker against Protestant heresies.

A manuscript of David Calderwood's History of the Kirk of Scotland mentions the incident in the chapel of Edinburgh Castle, but places it a few years earlier, during the Regency of Mary of Guise. A verse suggests that his partner was also his laundress.

== Veneration and status as Dominican martyr ==
The 20th-century Dominican historian Fr. Raymund Devas, OP, writing a history with an imprimatur, has placed Black amongst a number of Dominicans who have been venerated, and even proceeded through a cause for Sainthood, or canonisation.

In the 1912 book, Dominican Martyrs of Great Britain, Black has a chapter devoted to him, by Fr. Devas, outlining his status as a Dominican martyr.

Three books from his library survive at the University of Glasgow.

== Works ==
The chief works of Black are as follows:

- De reali prasentia corporis Christi in sacramento alataris, lib. i.
- Acta colloquii cum Willoxio symmista, lib. i.
- Conciones piae/Conciones doctissime pias, lib, i.
- Monitorium ad apostatas, lib. i.

== See also ==
- Patrick Hamilton (martyr)
- George Wishart
- List of Protestant martyrs of the Scottish Reformation
- Saint John Ogilvie
- George Douglas (martyr)
- William Gibson (martyr)
- John Ingram (martyr)
- Hugh Barclay of Ladyland, David Graham, Laird of Fintry, Spanish blanks plot
- Patrick Primrose
- Alexander Cameron (priest)
- Forty Martyrs of England and Wales
- List of Catholic martyrs of the English Reformation
