= Henry Heath (martyr) =

English Roman Catholic priest and martyr

Blessed Henry Heath aka "Paul of St. Magdalene" OFM
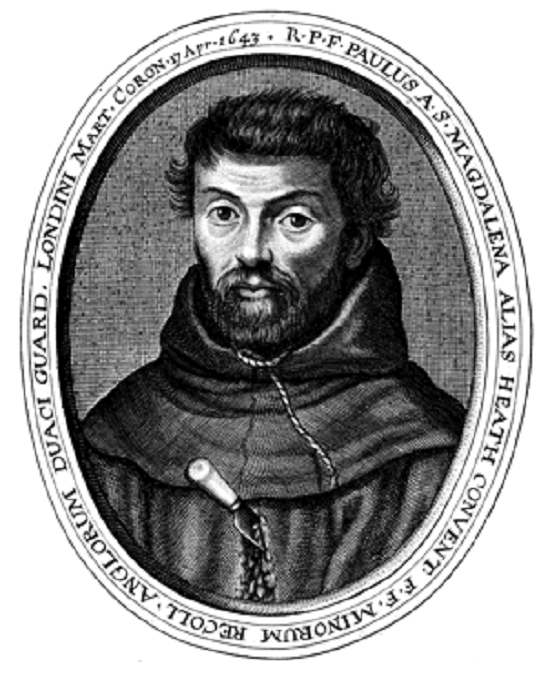

Martyr
- Born: baptized 16 December 1599; St. John's, Peterborough, England
- Died: 17 April 1643 (aged 42); Newgate, England
- Venerated in: Roman Catholic Church
- Beatified: 22 November 1987 by Pope John Paul II
- Feast: 17 April, 22 November (with the Martyrs of England and Wales

Henry Heath (1599–1643), religious name Paul of St. Magdalene, was an English priest of the Order of Friars Minor and a Roman Catholic martyr.

== Biography ==
Heath was born in 1599 and baptised at St. John's, Peterborough, 16 December 1599. His father was John Heath. He attended Corpus Christi College, Cambridge, receiving a Bachelor of Arts in 1621, and was made college librarian. In 1622 he was received into the Roman Catholic Church by George Muscott, and, after a short stay at the English College at Douai, entered the Franciscan convent of St. Bonaventure's there in 1625, taking the name of Paul of St. Magdalen.

Early in 1643, Heath with much trouble obtained leave to go on the English mission and crossed from Dunkirk to Dover disguised as a sailor. A German gentleman paid for his passage and offered him further money for his journey, but, in the spirit of St. Francis, Heath refused it and preferred to walk from Dover to London, begging his way.

On the very night of his arrival, as Heath was resting on a door step, the master of the house gave him into custody as a shoplifter. Some papers found in his cap betrayed his religion and he was taken to the Compter Prison. The next day he was brought before the Lord Mayor, and, on confessing he was a priest, was sent to Newgate. Shortly afterwards he was examined by a Parliamentary committee, and again confessed his priesthood. He was eventually indicted under the Jesuits, etc. Act 1584 for being a priest and present in the realm of Elizabeth I. While imprisoned at Tyburn he reconciled in the very cart one of the criminals that were executed with him. He was allowed to hang until he was dead.

Henry Heath was among the eighty-five martyrs of England and Wales beatified by Pope John Paul II on 22 November 1987.

There is a stained glass window of Heath in Our Lady of Lourdes in Harpenden, Hertfordshire.

== See also ==
- Catholic Church in the United Kingdom
- Douai Martyrs
