= Charles Meehan =

Charles Meehan may refer to:

- Charles Mahoney (martyr) (c. 1640–1679), alias Charles Meehan, Irish Franciscan friar and martyr
- Charles Patrick Meehan (1812–1890), Irish Catholic priest, historian and editor
