= Thomas Atkinson (priest) =

English Roman Catholic priest and martyr

Blessed Thomas Atkinson
- Born: about 1546; East Riding of Yorkshire, England
- Died: 11 March 1616 (aged about 70); York, Yorkshire, England
- Honored in: Roman Catholic Church
- Beatified: 22 November 1987 by Pope John Paul II
- Feast: 11 March (individual); 29 October (one of the Douai Martyrs); 22 November (together with Eighty-five martyrs of England and Wales)

Thomas Atkinson (born about 1546, died 11 March 1616) was an English Roman Catholic priest. He is a Catholic martyr, beatified in 1987.

== Life ==
He was born in the East Riding of Yorkshire, was ordained priest at Reims, and returned to England in 1588.

He was well known, especially for visiting poor Catholics, and eventually he could not safely travel by day. He always travelled by foot until, having broken his leg, he had to ride a horse. At the age of 70 he was betrayed and taken to York with his host, Mr. Vavasour of Willitoft, and some members of the family.

A pair of beads and the form of an indulgence were found upon him, and he was condemned to be hanged, drawn, and quartered.

== "Nicholas Atkinson" ==
Nicholas Atkinson (died 1610) was said to have been an English Catholic priest and martyr. According to the historian Charles Dodd he was executed in York in 1610, in the reign of James I. The Catholic Encyclopedia thinks that it was probable that Dodd had confused him with Thomas Atkinson, the subject of this article, although there was a Marian priest called Nicholas, or "Ninny", Atkinson.

== See also ==
- Douai Martyrs
- Eighty-five martyrs of England and Wales
