= Nicholas Woodfen =

English Roman Catholic priest and martyr

- Born: ca. 1550, Leominster, Herefordshire
- Died: 21 January 1586 (aged 35–36), Tyburn, Middlesex
- Means of martyrdom: Hanged, drawn and quartered
- Venerated in: Roman Catholic Church
- Beatified: 22 November 1987, by Pope John Paul II

Nicholas Woodfen born Nicholas Wheeler (1550 - 21 January 1586), also known as Nicholas Devereux, was an English Roman Catholic priest who was hanged, drawn and quartered at Tyburn, London on 21 January 1586. He is considered a Catholic martyr and one of the Eighty-five martyrs of England and Wales who were executed between 1584 and 1679. He was beatified on 22 November 1987 by Pope John Paul II.

== Early life, education and death ==
Nicholas Wheeler was born in Leominster, Herefordshire, around 1550, and was educated at the Leominster Grammar School.

Wheeler probably arrived at the English College at Douai, in April 1577, and when the college relocated to Rheims in 1579, he adopted the surname of Woodfen. Woodfen was ordained by the Bishop of Châlons-sur-Marne on 25 March 1581. He returned to England the following June as a missionary at the Inns of Court in London. He was arrested for high treason and indicted under the name Nicholas Devereux under the Jesuits, etc. Act 1584. He was hung, drawn and quartered on 21 January 1586 at Tyburn in London, along with Edward Stransham for being a priest.

== Veneration and beatification ==
Woodfen was venerated on 10 November 1986 by Pope John Paul II and beatified on 22 November 1987 also by Pope John Paul II.

== See also ==
- Douai Martyrs
- Eighty-five martyrs of England and Wales
