= Alexander Crow =

English Roman Catholic priest and martyr

Alexander Crow (died 1586/7) was born in Yorkshire around 1550. He took up an early trade as a shoemaker, and hearing of an opportunity to follow his trade at the English College, then at Rheims, he travelled to France. He worked as a cobbler, porter, then under-cook at the seminary. Eventually he trained as a priest and was ordained in Laon in 1583. In February 1584, he returned to the north of England to continue his mission for eighteen months, until he was arrested in South Duffield whilst baptising a baby. Taken to York, he was hanged, drawn and quartered on 30 November 1586 or 1587. Sources conflict as to the year of his death, whether it was 1586 or a year later, 'being about the year of thirty five,'

One of the Eighty-five martyrs of England and Wales, he was beatified by Pope John Paul II on 22 November 1987.

== See also ==
- Catholic Church in the United Kingdom
- Douai Martyrs
