= George Beesley =

English Roman Catholic priest and martyr

Blessed George Beesley

Martyr
- Born: c. 1562; The Hill in Goosnargh parish, Lancashire, England
- Died: 2 July 1591 (aged 28–29); Fleet Street, London, England
- Venerated in: Roman Catholic Church
- Beatified: 22 November 1987 by Pope John Paul II
- Feast: 1 July

George Beesley (or Bisley) (born c. 1562 at The Hill in Goosnargh parish, Lancashire, England; died 2 July 1591) was an English Roman Catholic diocesan priest. He is a Catholic martyr, beatified in 1987 as one of the Eighty-five martyrs of England and Wales.

== Life ==
Blessed George Beesley was born into a Catholic family in a farmhouse that is now the presbytery for St. Francis, Hill Chapel. With the church taken over by the newly established religion, the area Catholics held services in private homes. The Beesleys were frequently fined for not attending the official church.

George was ordained at the English College, Rheims, France for the diocese of Lancaster on 14 March 1587. On November 1, 1588, he went back to England. His younger brother, Richard, also became a priest.

In late 1590 he was captured and imprisoned for the crime of being a Roman Catholic priest. A man of singular courage, young, strong, and robust, his torture by Topcliffe left reduced to a skeleton. He was repeatedly tortured in order to give up the names of the other Catholics, but could not be induced to betray anyone. He was hanged, drawn and quartered in Fleet Street, London along with Montford Scott under the statute of 27 Eliz. (Jesuits, etc. Act 1584 ). His last words were "Good people, I beseech God to send all felicity".

George Beesley was beatified on 22 November 1987 by Pope John Paul II. His feast day is 1 July.

== See also ==
- Catholic Church in the United Kingdom
- Douai Martyrs
- Eighty-five martyrs of England and Wales
