= Robert Bickerdike (martyr) =

English Roman Catholic layman and martyr

Robert Bickerdike (died 1586) was an English Roman Catholic layman, executed on a treason charge. He is a Catholic martyr, beatified in 1987.

== Life ==
He was born at Low Hall, Farnham, near Knaresborough, and lived at York, where he was an apprentice. In the summer of 1585 he was seen having a glass of ale with Catholic priest John Boste, and as Bickerdike had paid, this was seen by some as sufficient grounds for an arrest. There being no evident proof, he was acquitted and discharged.

On 3 June 1586, when Francis Ingleby was being dragged on the hurdle to execution, hearing a minister's wife say: "Let us go into the Tolbooth and we shall see the traitorly thief come over on the hurdle", Bickerdike said, "No; no thief, but as true as thou art". The father of the minister's wife had Bickerdicke committed to Ousebridge Jail. On being found not guilty, Judge Rhodes had him removed from the city gaol to the Castle and tried once more at the Lammas Assizes on the same charge. He was then condemned. He was executed at York on 5 August or 8 October 1586.

== See also ==
- Eighty-five martyrs of England and Wales
