= George Douglas (martyr) =

Blessed George Douglas
- Born: c. 1540; Edinburgh, Scotland
- Died: 9 September 1587 (aged c. 47); York, England
- Venerated in: Catholic Church
- Beatified: 22 November 1993 by Pope John Paul II
- Feast: 4 May (Eighty-five martyrs of England and Wales)

George Douglas (c. 1540– 1587) was one of the Eighty-five martyrs of England and Wales.

== Life ==
Born in Edinburgh, he was originally a teacher by profession. His family were from Bonjedward near Jedburgh in the Scottish Borders.

Converting to Catholicism, he travelled to France around 1556 where he was ordained a secular priest in Notre Dame de Paris in 1574 - possibly at the testimonial of Mary, Queen of Scots. Returning to the north of England, he was a priest in York, where it seems he was 'apparelled in course canvas dublit and hose,' and in the East Midlands as well. Captured and found guilty in York of 'persuading the Queen's subjects away' from Protestantism, he was hung, drawn and quartered at York on 9 September 1587.

He was beatified by Pope John Paul II on 22 November 1987.

== See also ==
- Patrick Hamilton (martyr)
- George Wishart
- List of Protestant martyrs of the Scottish Reformation
- Saint John Ogilvie
- Forty Martyrs of England and Wales
- List of Catholic martyrs of the English Reformation
- John Black (martyr)
- William Gibson (martyr)
- John Ingram (martyr)
- Patrick Primrose
- Hugh Barclay of Ladyland, David Graham, Laird of Fintry, Spanish blanks plot
- Alexander Cameron (priest)
