= Thurston Hunt =

English Catholic priest

Blesseds Thurston Hunt and Robert Middleton S.J.

Priests, Martyrs
- Born: c. 1555 (Hunt) c. 1571 (Middleton); Carlton Hall, near Leeds (Hunt) York, England (Middleton)
- Died: 31 March 1601 (Hunt aged 45 - 46) (Middleton aged 29 - 30); Lancaster, Lancashire, England
- Venerated in: Catholic Church
- Beatified: 22 November 1987 by Pope John Paul II
- Feast: 31 March, August 7 (feast day of the Lancaster Martyrs), 22 November

Thurston Hunt (executed 31 March 1601 at Lancaster) was an English Catholic priest. He was tried and executed with Robert Middleton, also a priest. They were declared to be martyrs by the Catholic Church, and beatified in 1987, by Pope John Paul II.

A contemporary sang of

Hunt's hawtie corage staut,
With godlie zeale soe true,
Myld Middleton, O what tongue
Can halfe thy vertue showe!

== History ==
Thurston Hunt was born in 1555, and belonged to a family living at Carlton Hall, near Leeds. He also studied for the priesthood at Rheims (1583–84). When Middleton was arrested by chance near Preston, four Catholics, including Hunt, attempted to rescue him but the attempt failed. After a long tussle, Hunt was himself captured.

Robert Middleton was from York. Born in 1571, he was a nephew of Margaret (Middleton) Clitheroe, who was pressed to death in 1586 for refusing to enter a plea to the charge of harbouring Catholic priests. Initially a member of the Church of England, he became a practising Catholic and went to Rheims to study at the English College. From there he went to the English College of St Gregory in Seville, and then in 1597 to the English College in Rome. He was ordained on 4 January 1598 and then a few months later left for the English mission. Prior to being captured in the autumn of 1600, he had expressed a wish to join the Jesuits.

The two were heavily shackled night and day. By order of the Privy Council, their feet tied beneath their horses' bellies, and they were carried in public disgrace to London and back to Lancaster, where they were condemned and executed for being ordained overseas and daring to return as priests.

The local population showed their disapproval; no one would hire his horse to drag them to the place of execution. Middleton's sister was present at his execution and offered £100 for his life and for him to talk to a minister in the hope of re-converting him. He refused all attempts to sway him from his faith. They were hanged until they were almost dead, then cut down and beheaded. Their relics were quickly carried off after their death.

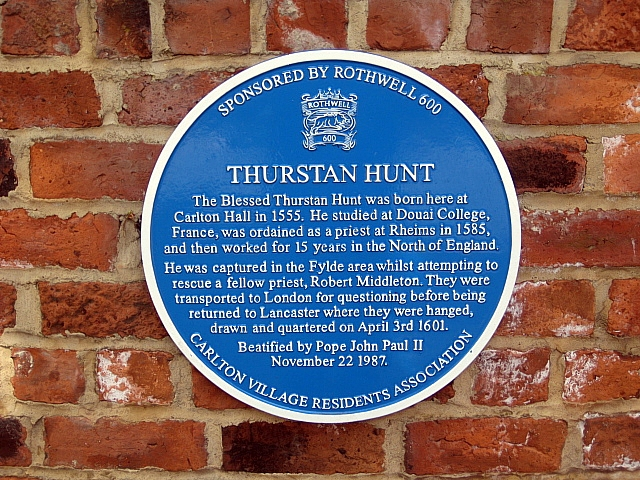
Blue plaque for Thurstan Hunt on Carlton Hall

Their names are inscribed on a plaque in Lancaster Castle dedicated to the Catholic Martyrs of Lancaster.

== See also ==
- Douai Martyrs
