= Thomas Belson =

English Roman Catholic layman and martyr

Blessed Thomas Belson
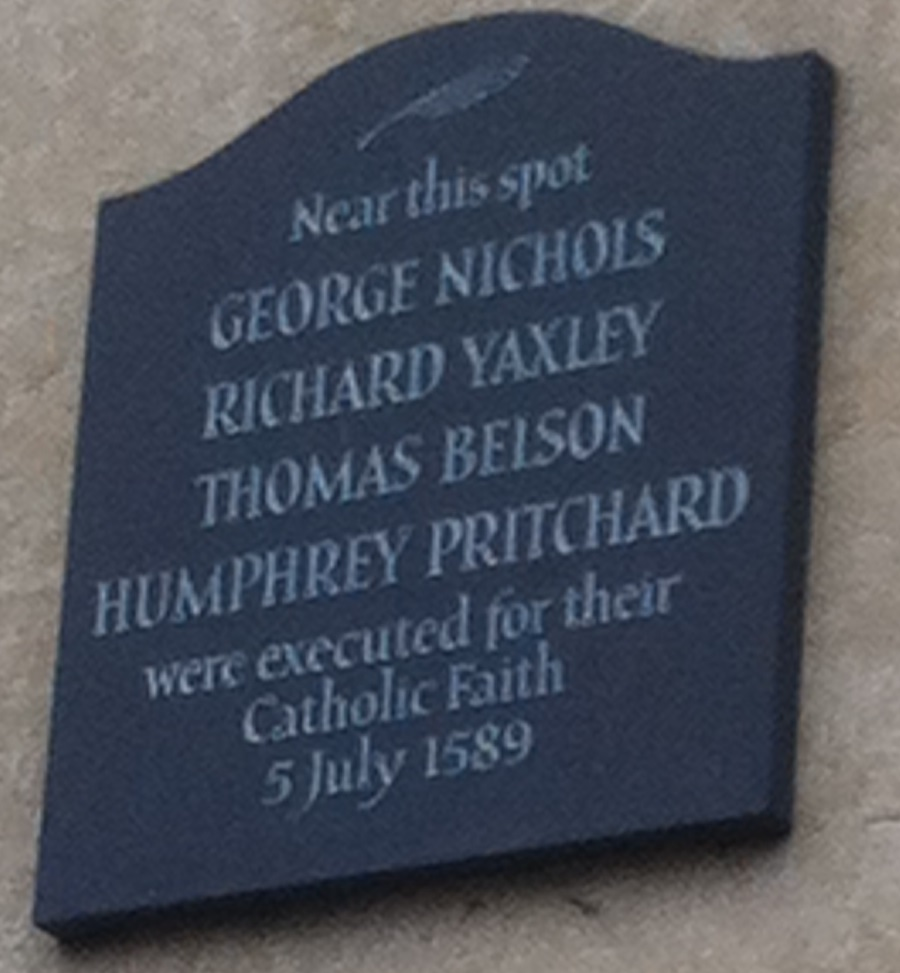
- Plaque commemorating the deaths of four Catholic martyrs on Longwall St, Oxford, UK.

Martyr
- Born: c. 1563; Brill, Buckinghamshire
- Died: 5 July 1589 (aged 35 - 36); Holywell, Oxford
- Venerated in: Roman Catholic Church
- Beatified: 22 November 1987 by Pope John Paul II
- Feast: 5 July

Thomas Belson (c. 1563 - 5 July 1589) was an English Roman Catholic layman and martyr, beatified in 1987.

== Life ==
Belson was born at Brill in Buckinghamshire, although the date is uncertain. He was the son of Augustine Belson. He studied at St Mary's Hall, Oxford, part of Oriel College, but did not take the B. A.; and then at the Catholic seminary in Reims. In 1584 he returned to England and was arrested, and imprisoned in the Tower of London. Eventually, in 1586, he was banished.

In 1589 he was in Aston Rowant, Oxfordshire when he evaded being captured and fled to Ixhill Lodge in Oakley, Buckinghamshire where he hid in a priest hole, after some days he went to Oxford and was again arrested, at the Catherine Wheel Inn, near Balliol College, Oxford. He was with his confessor George Nicols, Richard Yaxley, a priest, and Humphrey Pritchard, a servant. They were sent to London, whence, after examination before Walsingham and repeated tortures in Bridewell and the Tower, they were sent back to Oxford to be tried.

Belson was found guilty of felony for assisting the priests, and was executed at Oxford on 5 July 1589.

In 1987, Belson and his companions were among eighty-five martyrs of England and Wales to be beatified by Pope John Paul II. A memorial to these four Roman Catholic martyrs was erected on the nearest house to the Holywell Gallows in October 2008.

A book entitled "Blessed Thomas Belson: His Life and Times 1563 - 1589" was written by Christine Kelly in 1988. This narrative provides insights into the courage and devotion of English Catholics at a time when the practice of their faith was punishable by death.

== See also ==
- Douai Martyrs
