= Thomas Sherwood (martyr) =

English Roman Catholic martyr

Blessed Thomas Sherwood

Martyr
- Born: c. 1551; London
- Died: 7 February 1578 (aged 27); Tyburn, London
- Venerated in: Roman Catholic Church
- Beatified: 29 December 1886, Rome by Pope Leo XIII
- Attributes: holding a scroll

Thomas Sherwood (c. 1551–1578) was a Catholic layman and martyr. He was arrested on suspicion of treason, having visited a house where it seems that Mass was secretly celebrated.

== Life ==
Sherwood was born in London of Henry and Elizabeth Sherwood, Catholics who both endured imprisonment for their faith. His father, Henry Sherwood, was a woolen draper. Thomas was a cousin of Francis Tregian who was later imprisoned for sheltering Cuthbert Mayne.

At the age of fifteen Thomas left school to assist his father in the woolen business for the next ten years. In 1576 he decided to travel to the new English College at Douai and study for the priesthood. He subsequently returned home to adjust his accounts, and obtain funds to support his studies.

In the city he was a visitor to the house of Lady Tregonwell of Dorsetshire, where it seems that Mass was secretly offered. The woman's son, by her first marriage, Protestant George Marten, resented this. Happening to see Sherwood in the street in Chancery Lane, he began to cry "Stop the traitor" aloud. In this way he managed to have Thomas brought before a judge.

Although there was no proof of any kind against him, he implicated himself by answering openly on the issue of the Queen's supremacy. Being examined before the Recorder as to his opinion of the bull of Pius V and as to whether an excommunicated queen held lawful sovereignty, he denied all knowledge of both Bull and excommunication, but expressed his opinion that if the queen were indeed excommunicated her rule could not be lawful. Once he had been imprisoned in the Tower of London, and at the orders of the Privy Council, his lodgings were searched and a large sum of money, approximately 20-30 pounds, which Thomas had borrowed to help his sick father, was removed. The funds were confiscated.

== Death ==
Twice racked with a view to extracting details of houses where the Roman Catholic Mass was celebrated, Thomas kept silent. As a result, he was then thrown into a dungeon to rot, where he endured hunger and cold for three winter months. The cell was below the water line, and as the Thames rose with the tide, rats would be driven into the dark chamber. The only concession that William Roper, Thomas More's son-in-law, could obtain was permission to supply him with straw to lie upon. Roper sent money to Sherwood's jailer in order to purchase food, but the funds were returned as the Lieutenant would not allow Sherwood benefit of any alms.

After a hasty trial, and the sentence of hanging, drawing and quartering, carried out on 7 February 1578 at Tyburn, where he was cut down while still alive. Sherwood was 27 years of age.

Sherwood's mother, being repeatedly discovered at Mass, was intermittently imprisoned for a total of fourteen years. In the end, she died in prison, having exhausted whatever funds she had to provide for her maintenance. His brother, John, left for the continent, where he joined the Jesuits.

== Beatification ==
Thomas Sherwood is said to have been a small man, witty, cheerful and loved by many. He was beatified "equipollently" by Pope Leo XIII, by means of a decree of 29 December 1886.

== Sources ==
- Anstruther, Godfrey, Seminary Priests, St Edmund's College, Ware, vol. 1, 1968, pp. 313–314.
- Wainewright, John B., "Sir John Tregonwell's Second Wife", in Notes and Queries 11 S. VI (149), Nov. 2, 1912, pp. 347–348
