= Thomas Palasor =

English Roman Catholic priest and martyr

Blessed Thomas Palasor
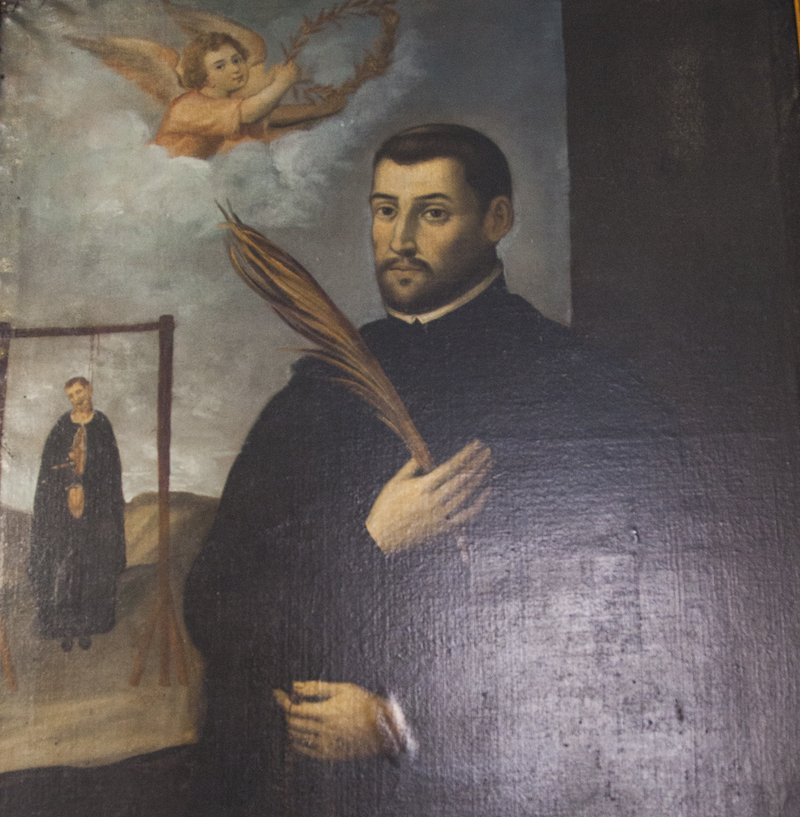
- Portrait in the Royal English College in Valladolid

Priest and Martyr
- Born: c.1570 Ellerton-on-Swale, parish of Catterick, North Riding of Yorkshire
- Died: 9 August 1600 (aged 29 - 30); Durham, England
- Venerated in: Roman Catholic Church
- Beatified: 22 November 1987 by Pope John Paul II
- Feast: 9 August, 22 November, 29 October
- Attributes: martyr's palm

Thomas Palasor (c. 1570 - 9 August 1600) was an English Catholic priest. He was a martyr of the English Reformation and was beatified in 1987.

== Life ==
Palasor was born at Ellerton-on-Swale, parish of Catterick, North Riding of Yorkshire. He arrived at Reims on 24 July 1592, and set out for the English College, Valladolid on 24 August 1592. There, he was ordained priest in 1596.

He was arrested in the house of John Norton, of Ravensworth, nearly Lamesley, County Durham. Norton seems to have been the second son of Richard Norton, of Norton Conyers, attainted for his share in the Rising of the North in 1569. Norton and his wife (if the identification is correct, she was his second wife, Margaret, daughter of Christopher Redshaw of Owston) were arrested at the same time, with a noble English gentleman, the Blessed John Talbot, one of the Talbots of Thornton-le-Street, North Riding of Yorkshire.

All four were tried at Durham and condemned to death, Palasor for being a priest, and the others for assisting him. Another gentleman was condemned at the same time but saved his life by conforming to the Church of England, as the others might have done. Mrs. Norton, being supposed to be with child, was reprieved. The three others were executed together.

Richard Challoner tells how an attempt to poison Palasor and his companions made by the jailer's wife resulted in the conversion of her maid-servant Mary Day. Thomas Palasor, John Norton and John Talbot were beatified as members of the Eighty-five martyrs of England and Wales by Pope John Paul II at the Vatican on 22 November, 1987.

== See also ==
- Douai Martyrs
