= Dryburne Martyrs =

English Roman Catholic priests and martyrs

The Dryburne Martyrs: Richard Hill, Richard Holiday, John Hogg and Edmund Duke (all died 27 May 1590) were English Roman Catholic priests and martyrs, executed at Dryburne, County Durham, in the reign of Elizabeth I. They were beatified by Pope John Paul II in 1987.

== History ==
Not much is known of their early lives. Duke was born in Kent in 1563. The other three came from Yorkshire (Hogg from Cleveland) but their dates of birth are unknown. They all arrived in the mid-1580s at the English College at Rheims to study for the priesthood.

Duke arrived in Rheims on 3 March 1583 and was ordained to minor orders there on 23 September 1583. He was subsequently sent to Rome and entered the English College there on 22 August 1584. He was ordained to the priesthood in the Lateran Basilica on 3 September 1589. Leaving the city for England, he set out on 15 September and on 15 October reached Rheims.

Holiday arrived on 6 September 1584, Hill on 15 May 1587, and Hogg on 15 October 1587. The three were together ordained subdeacons at Soissons on 18 March 1589, by Bishop Jérôme Hennequin, deacons 27 May and priests 23 September at Laon by Bishop Valentine Douglas, O.S.B.

Hill, Holiday, Hogg and Duke were all sent on the English mission on 22 March 1590 but aroused suspicion by keeping together as a band and were arrested in County Durham soon after landing in the North of England.

Given the 1584 Act making it a capital offence to be a Catholic priest in England the sentence of hanging, drawing and quartering was inevitable. The trial was at Durham and the sentence was carried out there. The gallows in Durham were at Dryburn, opposite the present County Hall, probably within what is now the grounds of St. Leonard's Catholic School. According to legend, "After the execution, it was noticed that a small stream near the site had completely dried up, and so the area is known as 'Dryburn' to this day." The place however had this name before their deaths.

With the priests were executed four common criminals felons, who declared that they, too, died Catholics. In the crowd were a good number of Catholics and reportedly when the priests' heads were as customary cut off and held up, only the officers and a Protestant minister or two would say "God save the Queen". It is also said that two Protestant spectators, Robert Maire and his wife Grace Maire, were converted to the Catholic faith.

Unusually the record of the event has survived in the registers of St Oswald's parish, Durham.

== Veneration ==
All four were beatified by Pope John Paul II on 22 November 1987.

Blessed Edmund Duke Parish is located in Coxhoe, Durham The Durham Martyrs Memorial is located south of Framwellgate Moor, across from County Hall. The Diocese of Hexham & Newcastle celebrates the feast day of the "Blessed Martyrs of the Diocese" on 24 July.

== See also ==
- Catholic Church in the United Kingdom
- Douai Martyrs
- Eighty-five martyrs of England and Wales
- John Boste - martyred at Dryburne 1594
- List of Catholic martyrs of the English Reformation

== Sources ==
- Anstruther, Godfrey. Seminary Priests, St Edmund's College, Ware, vol. 1, 1968, pp. 107, 167, 170, 172.

Attribution
