= Charles Mahoney (martyr) =

Irish Franciscan friar and martyr

Blessed Charles Mahoney OFM

Martyr
- Born: ca. 1640; Kingdom of Ireland
- Died: 12 August 1679; Ruthin, Denbighshire, Wales, Kingdom of England
- Venerated in: Catholic Church (United Kingdom)
- Beatified: 22 November 1997 by Pope John Paul II
- Feast: 4 May

Charles Mahoney (or Mahony; alias Charles Meehan; c. 1640 – 12 August 1679) was an Irish Franciscan friar. He is considered a martyr by the Roman Catholic Church, one of the Eighty-five martyrs of England and Wales beatified by Pope John Paul II in 1987. Their feast day is celebrated on 4 May.

== Life ==
Mahoney belonged to the Irish Province of the Order of Friars Minor and spent some of 1676 at Saint Isidore's College in Rome, headquarters of the province in exile. Attempting to return to Ireland from the continent where he had been ordained to priesthood, he was shipwrecked and landed in Wales. He was arrested in 1678 and imprisoned at Denbigh. He went on trial the following year at Ruthin in northern Wales where he was condemned and hanged.

The documentary evidence is scanty. The British Museum has a copy of a single sheet entitled The Last Speeches of Three Priests that were Executed for Religion, Anno Domini 1679, from which the following transcript is made:

An Account of the words spoken by Mr. Charles Mahoney, an Irish Priest of the holy Order of St. Francis, who was Executed in his Habit at Ruthin in North Wales, August 12, 1679. Now God Almighty is pleased I should suffer Martyrdom, his Holy Name be praised, since I dye for my Religion. But you have no Right to put me to death in this Country, though I confessed myself to be a Priest, for you seized me as I was going to my Native Country Ireland, being driven at Sea on this Coast, for I never used my Function in England before I was taken, however God forgive you, as I do and shall always pray for you, especially for those that were so good to me in my distress, I pray God bless our King, and defend him from his Enemies, and convert him to the Holy Catholick Faith, Amen. His Age was under Forty, He was tryed and Condemned at Denby [i.e. Denbigh] Confessing himself to be a Priest.

Richard Challoner based his account on this single sheet, but may have had another source, now lost.
