= Margaret of Fontana =

Saint Margaret of Fontana
- Born: 1440; Modena, Italy
- Died: 1513; Italy
- Venerated in: Roman Catholic Church
- Patronage: possessed people women in labour

Margaret of Fontana (1440–1513) was a Dominican sister of the Third Order and is a Roman Catholic saint.

Margaret was born in Modena, Italy. She was as being very pious from an early age and vowed her virginity to God. She joined the Dominican Third Order. She helped the poor and the sick and was known to stay up all night praying. Miraculous healings were reported from her intercessions. She is said to have driven demons away by making the Sign of the Cross. She died in Italy in 1513.
