= William Pike (martyr) =

English Roman Catholic martyr

Blessed William Pike
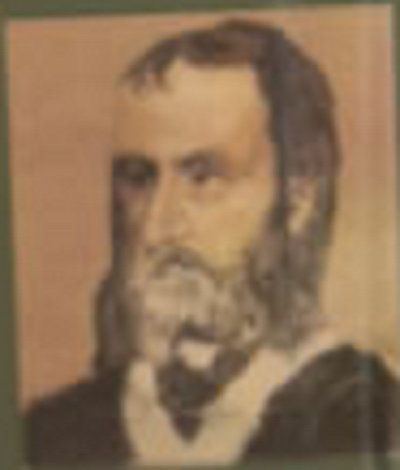
- Portrait in the Chideock Martyrs Church in Chideock, England

Martyr
- Born: about 1555; Dorset, South West England
- Died: 22 December 1591 (aged about 36); Dorchester, Dorset, England
- Venerated in: Roman Catholic Church
- Beatified: 22 November 1987 by Pope John Paul II
- Feast: 22 December

William Pike (died 22 December 1591) was an English Roman Catholic martyr who was beatified in 1987.

Several sources state that William was born in Dorset. In 'A History of Dorset' (ISBN 0705000109) A. Lindsay Clegg, former Town Clerk of Bournemouth, claims that Pike lived at Moordown, now within modern Bournemouth, then part of the Liberty of Westover. Pike, or Pyk was a common name in Westover since the 14th century, according to the Christchurch Cartulary (ISBN 1859757618).

Pike is also said to have lived at West Moors in West Parley, where he worked as a carpenter. He was executed by being hung, drawn and quartered on 22 December 1591 for denying the Royal Supremacy. He is thought to have been converted to Catholicism by Thomas Pilchard. Rachel Lloyd suggests that the Pikes were a Bristol family, and that William (who lived in the Village of Moors on the Hampshire border) was the brother of Martha Pike. Martha's husband Henry Falkner had converted priest John Chapman to Catholicism, in 1579. Henry mentioned his brother-in-law William Pike in his will.
