= William Way =

English Catholic priest and martyr

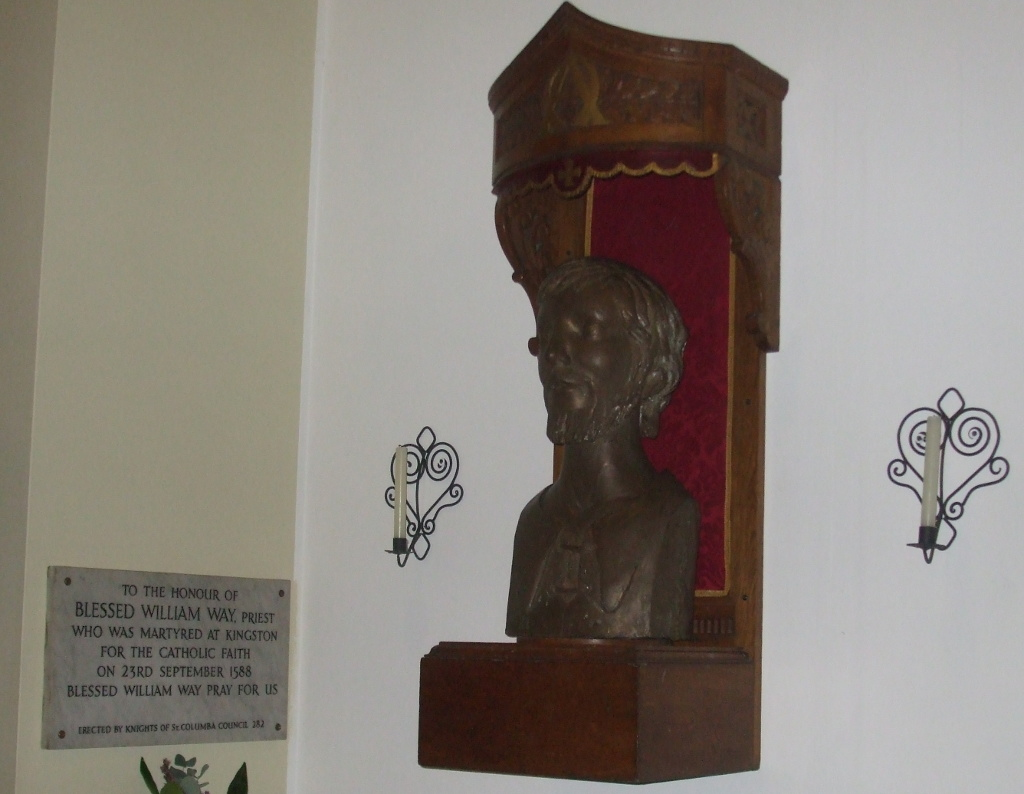
- Shrine to William Way
- Born: c. 1560; Cornwall or Devon
- Died: 23 September 1588; Kingston upon Thames
- Major shrine: St. Agatha's Catholic Church, Kingston upon Thames
- Feast: 23 September

William Way (alias May, alias Flower) (died 1588) was an English Catholic priest and martyr executed under Elizabeth I after the Protestant Reformation. He is venerated in the Roman Catholic Church.

== Early life and education ==
William Way was born in the Diocese of Exeter about c. 1560. Bishop Richard Challoner said he was born in Cornwall, and earlier authorities say in Devonshire.

Since the Protestant Reformation had closed Catholic seminaries in England, Way went to France to study. On 31 March 1584, he received his first tonsure in the Cathedral of Reims from the Cardinal of Guise. On 22 March he was ordained subdeacon, on 5 April deacon, and priest on 18 September 1586, at Laon, probably by Bishop Valentine Douglas (Valentine Duglas), O.S.B.

== Career ==
Way departed for England on 9 December 1586, and by June 1587, was imprisoned. He was indicted at Newgate in September 1588, for being a Roman Catholic priest. He declined to be tried by a secular judge, whereupon the Bishop of London was sent for. Way, refusing to acknowledge him as a bishop or Elizabeth I as head of the church, was immediately condemned as a traitor and to death.

He was austere. When called to trial at the Sessions in August, "he had so much joy that he seemed past himself". Way was "hung, drawn and quartered" at Kingston upon Thames. The date is variously given as either 23 September or 1 October 1588.

== See also ==
- Richard Flower
