= William Lampley (martyr) =

William Lampley (died 1588) was a sixteenth-century English recusant. A glover by trade, he was described as being 'little of education, yet with an almost apostolic zeal in religion.' Apparently betrayed by one whom he had recently aided, he was convicted of assisting priests. He was executed in Gloucester on 1 August 1588.

He was beatified by Pope John Paul II on 22 November 1987.
