= Thomas Sprott =

English martyr (1600)

Blessed Thomas Sprott
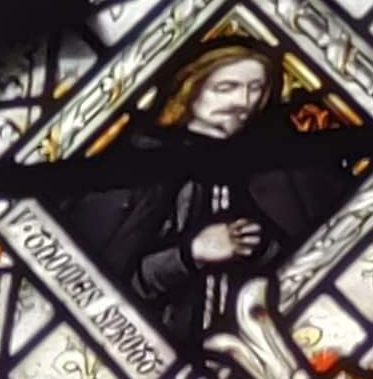

Martyr
- Born: c. 1571; Skelsmergh, near Kendal in Westmorland
- Died: 11 July 1600 (aged about 29); Lincoln, Lincolnshire
- Honored in: Roman Catholic Church
- Beatified: 22 November 1987, Saint Peter's Basilica by Pope John Paul II
- Feast: 11 July

Thomas Sprott (d. 11 July 1600), also spelled Thomas Spratt, was an English martyr, as was his colleague, Thomas Hunt, who is also known as Thomas Benstead.

== Biography ==
Thomas Sprott (alias "Parker") was born in about 1571 at Skelsmergh, near Kendal in Westmorland; suffered at Lincoln with Thomas Hunt on 11 July 1600. Sprott studied at Douai College in northern France, where he was ordained priest in 1596. He was sent on the English mission that same year, and signed the letter to the pope, dated 8 November 1598, in favour of the institution in England of the archpriest. Sprott had hoped to join the Jesuits.

== Thomas Hunt ==
Blessed Thomas Hunt
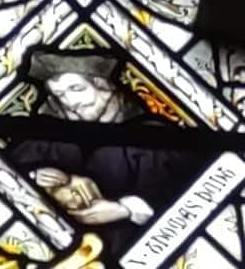

Martyr
- Born: possibly as "Thomas Benstead" c. 1573; Norfolk, England
- Died: 11 July 1600 (aged about 27); Lincoln, Lincolnshire
- Honored in: Roman Catholic Church
- Beatified: 22 November 1987, Saint Peter's Basilica by Pope John Paul II
- Feast: 11 July

Hunt was born in Norfolk in approximately 1573. Bede Camm says that his real name was probably Bensted or Benstead, as that was how Henry Garnet referred to him. He studied for the priesthood at the Royal English College in Valladolid and subsequently the English College of Seville, being ordained in 1599. His service in England was brief, being initially imprisoned at Wisbech, where he then escaped with five others.

== Arrest and Execution ==
Some months later, they were arrested at the Saracen's Head, Lincoln, upon the discovery of the holy oils and two Breviaries in their possession. When brought to trial, their being priests was neither proved nor confessed, nor was any evidence produced. Judge Sir John Glanville berated the jury when it failed to find the defendants guilty. Hunt then said that if the judge thought them guilty he should pronounce sentence himself and not bring "innocent blood" on the heads of those who understood neither the law nor the case.

Taking exception to the phrase "innocent blood", Glanville responded, "Let your blood which you call innocent be on me and my head." He then directed the jury to find them guilty, which was done. His words were remembered when sixteen days later Glanville died while riding a quiet cob in the meadows; his horse suddenly shied and threw him and he suffered a broken neck.

Thomas Sprott and Thomas Hunt were among the eighty-five martyrs of England and Wales beatified by Pope John Paul II on 22 November 1987.

== See also ==
- Douai Martyrs
