= George Nichols (martyr) =

English Catholic martyr

- Born: 1550; Oxford, England
- Died: July 5, 1589; Holywell, Oxford, England
- Cause of death: Hanged, drawn, and quartered
- Beatified: 1987 by Pope John Paul II

George Nichols (c. 1550 – 19 October 1589) was an English Catholic martyr.

== Biography ==
=== Education ===
Born at Oxford in 1550, George Nichols entered Brasenose College, a constituent college of the University of Oxford, in 1564 or 1565 where he received his B.A. degree in 1571. He went on to become an usher and a teacher at St. Paul's School in London where he was received into the Catholic Church. Nichols went overseas in November 1581 to enroll at the Douai College (located in Rheims at the time); which was a seminary for English Catholic priests. He became a subdeacon and deacon in April 1583, and was shortly afterwards ordained a priest by Louis II, Cardinal of Guise on 24 September 1583. That same year he was sent back to Oxford for his mission.

=== Arrest and death ===
In Oxford, Catholicism was increasing rapidly. Nichols during this time had converted many to the Catholic faith, notably a convicted highwayman in Oxford Castle. In May 1589 he was arrested at the Catherine Wheel Inn, opposite St Mary Magdalen Church in Oxford, with another priest Richard Yaxley, and two laymen, Humphrey Pritchard and Thomas Belson. The men were accused of treason in accordance to a statute issued by Parliament following the Papal bull issued by Pope Pius V.

The four men were ultimately sent to Bridewell Prison in London, where Nichols and Yaxley were hung from their hands for up to fifteen hours to make them betray their faith, but without any success. Nichols was then separated from the rest of the three prisoners and put into a dungeon full of vermin. On 30 June all four were ordered back to Oxford for their trial. Nichols and his fellow prisoners were tried under the recent statute imposing the death sentence on any Englishman ordained abroad who entered England and on anyone helping such a person. All were condemned, the priests for treason, the laymen for felony. On 5 July 1589, Nichols and Yaxley were hanged, drawn, and quartered in Holywell, Oxford, while Belson and Prichard were hanged. George Nichols, having been refused permission to address the crowd, made it clear that he was being executed merely because he was a priest. After the execution the priests' heads were set up on the castle, and their quarters on the four city gates. The severity of the punishment seemed to have an effect on the people of Oxford for it would be 20 years before another Catholic recusant was executed in Oxford.

In 1987, Nichols and the three other prisoners were among eighty-five martyrs of England and Wales to be beatified by Pope John Paul II. A memorial to these four Roman Catholic martyrs was erected on the nearest house to the Holywell Gallows in October 2008.

== See also ==
- Catholic Church in the United Kingdom
- Douai Martyrs
