= John Finglow =

English Roman Catholic priest

John Finglow, also known as John Fingley (circa 1550 - 8 August 1586) was an English Roman Catholic priest. He is a Catholic martyr, beatified in 1987.

== Life ==
Born at Barmby, East Yorkshire Barmby on the Marsh, near Howden, Yorkshire, John Finglow was matriculated sizar from Caius College, Cambridge in December 1573. He arrived at the English College at Reims on 9 February 1580 and was ordained priest 25 March 1581. On 24 April, The following month he was sent on the English mission.

He worked for about five years in the north of England before being arrested and confined in Ousebridge Kidcote, York. He was tried for being a Catholic priest and reconciling English subjects to the Catholic Church, and was condemned to be hanged, drawn, and quartered.

== See also ==
- Eighty-five martyrs of England and Wales

== Sources ==
- Thompson Cooper, ‘Finglow, John (d. 1586/7)’, rev. Sarah Elizabeth Wall, Oxford Dictionary of National Biography, Oxford University Press, 2004. Retrieved 7 September 2008
