= Edward Osbaldeston =

English martyr

Blessed Edward Osbaldeston
- Born: c.1560
- Died: 16 November 1594
- Beatified: 22 November 1987 by Pope John Paul II

Edward Osbaldeston was an English martyr, born about 1560. Не was hanged, drawn and quartered at York, 16 November 1594.

== Life ==
Edward Osbaldeston was born about 1560 at Osbaldeston Hall near Blackburn, Lancashire. He was the son of Thomas Osbaldeston, and nephew of Edward Osbaldeston, of Osbaldeston Hall. He went to the English College of Douai, then at Reims, where he was ordained deacon in December 1583, and priest 21 September 1585. He had said his first Mass on the feast day of St. Jerome, and in consequence had a great devotion to that saint.

Bishop Richard Challoner includes the greater part of a letter addressed by Osbaldeston to his fellow-prisoners in York Castle within his accounting of Catholic martyrs of the English Reformation entitled Memoirs of Missionary Priests and other Catholicks of both Sexes who suffered Death or Imprisonment in England on account of their Religion, from the year 1577 (Note: 1577 was the last year of the Catholic Mary I of England) till the end of the reign of Charles II.

Osbaldeston recounts in this letter that he was sent on the English mission 27 April 1589. He was later apprehended at night by a priest hunter named Thomas Clark at an inn at Tollerton, Yorkshire, on St. Jerome's Day, 30 September 1594. The day following his arrest he was taken to York Castle where he was tried at the next assizes and attained of high treason for being a priest.

Edward Osbaldeston was among the eighty-five martyrs of England and Wales beatified by Pope John Paul II on 22 November 1987. In the Roman Martyrology, his martyrdom is marked on a feast day particular to York for 16 November.

== See also ==
- Catholic Church in the United Kingdom
- Douai Martyrs
