= John Talbot (martyr) =

English Catholic recusant and martyr

Blessed John Talbot
- Born: c. 1550; Yorkshire, England
- Died: 9 August 1600; Durham, England
- Venerated in: Roman Catholic Church
- Feast: 9 August

John Talbot (died 9 August 1600) was an English Catholic recusant and martyr.

== Biography ==
John Talbot was born at Thornton-le-Street, North Yorkshire; suffered at Durham, 9 August 1600. He had already been persecuted for his adherence to the Catholic faith, having been convicted of recusancy in 1588.

As a result of his Catholic faith, Talbot suffered severe persecution, including multiple arrests, fines and confiscation of his property. He had to endure these punishments on a daily basis - a severe test of his faith and loyalty.

Talbot was present at prayer with the priest, Thomas Palasor, John Norton and several companions at a house in Lamesley, Gateshead when he was arrested in 1600. It was Talbot who tried to prevent the arrest of the priest. For this, he too was arrested as a traitor.

Talbot was imprisoned and confined in a dungeon and shortly thereafter, sentenced to be hanged, drawn and quartered for the crime of harbouring a Catholic priest. On Wednesday, 9 August 1600, Talbot was brought, together with Fr Thomas Palasor and John Norton, to the gallows site in Durham, on the crest of the hill at the north side of Durham City. He was given the chance to save his life if he would renounce the Catholic faith and attend Protestant services, but he refused. Talbot was tortured on the rack, hanged until not quite dead, then disembowelled, before being beheaded.

He was beatified by Pope John Paul II at the Vatican on 22 November 1987 as one of the Eighty-five martyrs of England and Wales. John Talbot's feast day is 9 August. He is also venerated on 4 May as one of the martyrs of England and Wales.
