= Richard Langley (martyr) =

16th-century Roman Catholic martyr

Venerable Richard Langley
- Born: Grimthorpe, Yorkshire
- Died: 1 December 1586, York, England
- Means of martyrdom: Hanged
- Venerated in: Roman Catholic Church

Richard Langley (died 1 December 1586) was an English Roman Catholic layman, condemned for sheltering Catholic priests. He is a Catholic martyr, beatified in 1929.

== Life ==
Langley was probably born at Grimthorpe in Yorkshire. From his father, Richard Langley, of Rathorpe Hall, Walton, he probably inherited Rathorpe, but for the greater part of his life continued to reside on his estate at Ousethorpe, in the East Riding of Yorkshire. His mother was Joan Beaumont of Mirfield. He married Agnes, daughter of Richard Hansby, New Malton, by whom he had one son, Christopher (b. 1565), and four daughters.

During the Elizabethan period Langley assisted the Catholic clergy; his house was offered as an asylum to priests. He constructed a subterranean retreat, perhaps beneath the Grimthorpe dwelling, which afforded them sanctuary. This refuge was betrayed to the President of the North, and on 28 October 1586, a strong band of military was despatched, several justices and Anglican ministers joining them, to make a domiciliary visitation of the Grimthorpe and Ousethorpe houses. Two priests were found in hiding at the former; at the latter Langley himself was seized. All three were carried to York, committed to prison, and subsequently arraigned before the President of the North, the priests because of their office and Langley for harbouring them.

During the investigation Langley would not take the oath of the queen's ecclesiastical supremacy, nor ingratiate himself with the lord president or Privy Council. The first jury of neighbors which had first been empaneled to decide upon the case was discharged and replaced by another. Langley was condemned to death, without any evidence being adduced to establish the fact that he had knowingly sheltered seminary priests; and he was hanged at York. His remains were refused an honourable burial.
