= Peter Snow (priest) =

English Roman Catholic priest

Blessed Peter Snow

Martyr
- Born: c. 1564; Ripon, North Yorkshire, England
- Died: 15 June 1598 (aged 32); Knavesmire, West Yorkshire, England
- Beatified: 22 November 1987 by Pope John Paul II
- Feast: 15 June, 22 November

Peter Snow (c. 1564 – 15 June 1598) was an English Catholic priest who was executed by the state, along with Ralph Grimston, in 1598. They were beatified as martyrs in 1987. Their feast is 15 June.

== Life ==
He was born at or near Ripon and arrived at the English College, Reims, 17 April 1589. He received the first tonsure and minor orders 18 August 1590, the subdiaconate at Laon on 22 September, and the diaconate and priesthood at Soissons on 30 and 31 March 1591. He left for England on the following 15 May.

It appears that he spent some time at Nidd Hall, the seat of the Trappes family, near Knaresborough. Nidd Hall was used to shelter priests. Ralph Grimston also lived at the hall. They were arrested on or about 1 May 1598, when on their way to York. Both were shortly after condemned, Snow of treason as being a priest and Grimston of felony, for having aided and assisted him, and, it is said, having lifted up his weapon to defend him at his apprehension. They were executed at Knavesmire in York. Snow was hanged, draw and quartered; Grimston was hanged. Their severed heads were place on spikes and set atop Micklegate Bar until retrieved by some local Catholics. He was 32.

== Relics in Leeds Cathedral ==
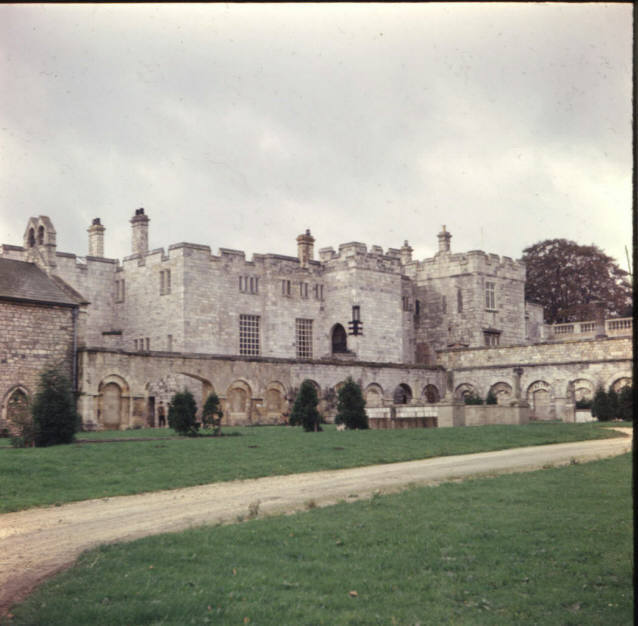
Hazlewood Castle

In 1845, two skulls were discovered under the stone floor of the ancient chapel of Hazlewood Castle, near Tadcaster. At the time they were thought to be relics of two other English martyrs, John Lockwood and Edmund Catherick and the skulls were placed in a niche near the altar. In 1909, Hildebrand Lane Fox, who was familiar with local traditions, stated that they were the relics of Peter Snow and Ralph Grimston. In 1968, the Carmelites acquired Hazlewood and a forensic examination was conducted on the skulls. By determining the approximate age of the individuals, Lockwood and Catherick were excluded.

Blessed Ralph Grimston

Martyr
- Died: 15 June 1598; Knavesmire, West Yorkshire, England
- Beatified: 22 November 1987 by Pope John Paul II
- Feast: 15 June, 22 November

In 2005, Arthur Roche, Bishop of Leeds, decided to place relics in Leeds Cathedral altar. The BBC's Inside Out program commissioned computerised likenesses from the University of Dundee. Pictures of the reconstructed faces of Peter Snow and Ralph Grimston can be found on Leeds Cathedral webpage.

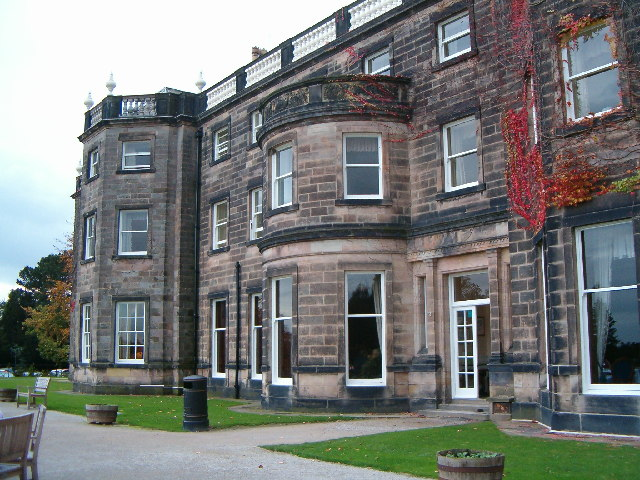
Nidd Hall

== See also ==
- Douai Martyrs
- Eighty-five martyrs of England and Wales
