= Christopher Wharton =

English Roman Catholic priest and martyr

Blessed Christopher Wharton
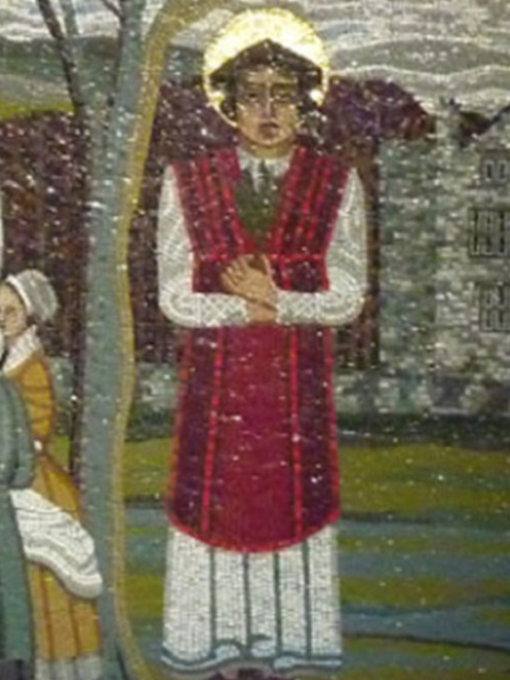

Priest and Martyr
- Born: between 1540 and 1546; Middleton, Yorkshire, England
- Died: 28 March 1600 (aged between 53 - 60); York, England
- Venerated in: Roman Catholic Church
- Beatified: 22 November 1987 by Pope John Paul II
- Feast: 28 March (individual) 29 October (Martyrs of Douai) 22 November (Eighty-five Martyrs of England and Wales)

Christopher Wharton (before 1546 – 28 March 1600) was an English Roman Catholic priest. He is a Catholic martyr, beatified in 1987.

== Life ==
Wharton was born at Middleton, Yorkshire, before 1546. He was the second son of Sir Thomas Wharton of Wharton and Agnes Warcop, and younger brother of Thomas Wharton, 1st Baron Wharton. He was educated at Trinity College, Oxford, where he graduated M.A., 3 February 1564, and afterwards became a Fellow. During his time at Oxford, he converted to Catholicism. In 1583 he left England and entered the English College at Reims to study for the priesthood (28 July). He was ordained priest in the following year (31 March), but continued his studies after ordination until 1586, when on 21 May he left Reims in company with Edward Burden.

No details of his missionary work have been preserved; but at his trial Baron Savile, the judge, incidentally remarked that he had known him at Oxford some years after 1596. He was finally arrested by Stephen Proctor within the park of Ripley Castle, in 1598, at the house of Eleanor Hunt, a widow, who was arrested with him and confined in York Castle. There, with other Catholic prisoners, he was forcibly taken to hear Protestant sermons. He was brought to trial together with Mrs. Hunt at the Lent Assizes 1600, and both were condemned, the former for high treason, the latter for felony. Both refused life and liberty at the price of conformity. Wharton was executed; Eleanor Hunt died in prison.

Christopher Wharton was beatified in 1987 by Pope John Paul II as one of the "Eighty Five Martyrs of England and Wales."

== Relics ==
Wharton's severed head was put on one of the gates of York but was rescued by Catholics, who kept it safe in Knaresborough. Later, it was taken into the care of the Benedictines at Downside Abbey, who returned it to Yorkshire in 2002 for the dedication of the Chapel of St. Mary and St. Margaret Clitheroe at Myddelton Grange Catholic retreat centre, Ilkley. The retreat centre has since closed. In March 2025, a relic was placed in the Martyr's Chapel in Leeds Cathedral.

== Legacy ==
The Blessed Christopher Wharton Multi-Academy Trust in Bradford takes its name from Wharton.

== See also ==
- Catholic Church in the United Kingdom
- Douai Martyrs
