= Hugh Taylor (priest) =

English Roman Catholic priest and martyr

Blesseds Hugh Taylor and Marmaduke Bowes

Priest and Layman, Martyrs
- Born: Taylor: Durham, County Durham, England; Bowes: Angram Grange near Appleton in Cleveland
- Died: Taylor: 25 November 1585; Bowes: 26 November 1585; York, North Yorkshire, England
- Venerated in: Roman Catholic Church
- Beatified: 22 November 1987 by Pope John Paul II
- Feast: 22, 25, or 26 November

Hugh Taylor (died 25 November 1585) was an English Roman Catholic priest. He is a Catholic martyr, beatified in 1987.

== Life ==
Born at Durham, Taylor arrived at Reims on 2 May 1582 and was ordained a priest. He was sent on the English mission on 27 March 1585.

He was the first to be executed under the Jesuits, etc. Act 1584, recently passed, which made it treason to be made a priest and then to come into the realm. Taylor was hanged, drawn, and quartered at York on 25 November 1585.

== Marmaduke Bowes ==
Marmaduke Bowes, a married gentleman yeoman. Bowes is described by Richard Challoner as of Angram Grange near Appleton in Cleveland, but is not mentioned in the will of Christopher Bowes of Angram Grange, proved on 30 September 1568, nor in the 1612 pedigree.

Although through fear of his property being confiscated he was an occasional conformist, he had a Catholic tutor for his children. The sole evidence against him was that of a former tutor to his children, an apostate Catholic. Having been previously imprisoned at York with his wife, he was under bond to appear at the Assizes which, began on 23 November at York, and on his arrival found that Taylor was about to be arraigned. Bowes was a Catholic who had outwardly conformed to the Church of England; he was openly a Catholic before his death. On 26 November he was hanged for having harboured Father Taylor. Bowes was the first layman executed for violation of the Jesuits, etc. Act 1584.

He was beatified by Pope John Paul II on 22 November 1987 as one of Eighty-five martyrs of England, Scotland and Wales. They have a joint commemoration on 22 November.

== See also ==
- Catholic Church in the United Kingdom
- Douai Martyrs
