= Christopher Robinson (priest) =

English Roman Catholic priest and martyr

Blessed Christopher Robinson
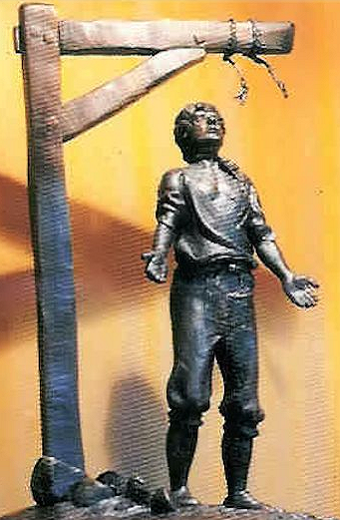
- Statuette of Blessed Christopher Robinson, part of a shrine in the church of Our Lady & St Joseph, Warwick Square, Carlisle.

Priest and Martyr
- Born: between 1565 and 1570 probably Woodside, near Carlisle
- Died: 19 August 1598 (aged between 27 - 33); Carlisle, Cumbria, England
- Venerated in: Roman Catholic Church
- Beatified: 22 November 1987 by Pope John Paul II
- Feast: 19 August, 7 August, 22 November
- Attributes: broken noose around neck

Christopher Robinson (died 19 August 1598) was an English Catholic priest and martyr, beatified in 1987.

== Life ==
Robinson was born at Woodside, near Westward, Cumberland between 1565 and 1570. He was admitted to the English College at Reims in 1589, and was ordained priest and sent on the English mission in 1592. Two years later he was a witness of the condemnation and execution of John Boste at Durham, and wrote a graphic account. His labours seem to have been mainly in Cumberland and Westmoreland, though details are unknown.

Eventually he was arrested at Johnby Hall and imprisoned at Carlisle, by the Anglican Bishop John May. May's successor, Henry Robinson, who may have been a relative, did his best to persuade him to save his life by conforming to the Church of England.

He himself was arrested three and a half years later on 4 March 1597. A letter by Henry Garnet dated 7 April 1597 states:

‘One Robinson, a seminary priest, was lately in a purchased gaol-delivery hanged at Carlisle. The rope broke twice and the third time he rebuked the sheriff for cruelty saying that, although he meant no way to yield but was glad of the combat, yet flesh and blood were weak, and therefore he showed little humanity to torment a man for so long. And when they took order to put two ropes, then, said he, by this means I shall be longer a-dying, but it is no matter, I am willing to suffer all.’

Under the anti-Catholic laws passed by the parliament of Queen Elizabeth I, which had outlawed Catholic priests from coming into the realm, he was condemned to death and executed. He was beatified in 1987 by Pope John Paul II, and is commemorated on 29 October among the Douai Martyrs.

== See also ==
- Catholic Church in the United Kingdom
- Douai Martyrs
