= Thomas Pilchard =

English Roman Catholic priest and martyr

Blessed Thomas Pilchard
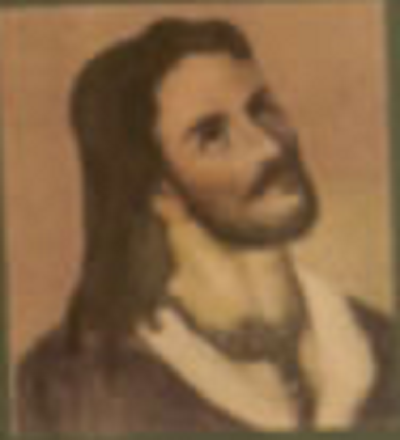
- Portrait in the Chideock Martyrs Church in Chideock, England

Priest and Martyr
- Born: 1557; Battle, Sussex
- Died: 21 March 1587 (aged 29 - 30); Dorchester
- Venerated in: Roman Catholic Church
- Beatified: 22 November 1987, Rome, Italy, by Pope John Paul II
- Feast: 21 March, 22 November, 4 May

Thomas Pilchard (Pilcher) (born at Battle, Sussex, 1557; executed at Dorchester, 21 March 1587) was an English Roman Catholic priest. He is a Catholic martyr, beatified in 1987 as one of the Eighty-five martyrs of England and Wales, with whom he is commemorated on 4 May.

== Life ==
Born into a family of five, as the son of David Pylcher of Battle, and Joane Haye of Robertsbridge, he was educated at Battle Abbey, where Battle was still a hotbed of Catholic recusancy. He became a Fellow of Balliol College, Oxford, in 1576, and took the degree of M.A., in 1579, resigning his fellowship the following year. He arrived at Reims 20 November 1581, and was ordained priest at Laon, March 1583.

He set out for the English mission on 4 May 1583, and worked in the area of Winchester. He was arrested soon after, and banished. Many of the missionaries were eager to return lest their absence be attributed to some compromise with the government. On 20 January 1586 Pilchard returned to England, and worked for almost a year. In London on business, he was recognised by someone who knew him from Oxford and was arrested early in March 1587, and imprisoned in Dorchester Gaol. Numerous conversions are attributed to him while in prison.

Executions for treason being rare in that part of the county, there was some difficulty finding anyone to carry out the sentence. At length a butcher was persuaded to undertake it for a considerable sum. The rope broke and Pilchard fell to his feet below the gallows. Compelled by the sheriff's men, the hired executioner then stabbed Pilchard, who turned to the sheriff and asked, "Is this then your justice, Mr. Sheriff?"

Thomas Pilchard is commemorated with the Dorset Martyrs memorial on Gallows Hill, Dorchester.

== See also ==
- Douai Martyrs
