= Francis Ingleby =

English Roman Catholic priest and martyr

Blessed Francis Ingleby

Martyr
- Born: c.1551 North Yorkshire, England
- Died: 3 June 1586 (aged 34–35); Knavesmire, York, England
- Venerated in: Roman Catholic Church
- Beatified: 22 November 1987 by Pope John Paul II
- Feast: 3 June, 22 November (with the Eighty-five martyrs of England and Wales

Francis Ingleby (c. 1551 – 3 June 1586) was a Roman Catholic martyr executed in York, England during the reign of Elizabeth I.

Born about 1551, he was the fourth son of Sir William Ingleby and Anne Malory of Ripley Castle, North Yorkshire. He was likely a scholar of Brasenose College, Oxford, (c. 1565), and was a student of the Inner Temple by 1576. On 18 August 1582, he arrived at the English College, Reims, where he lived at his own expense. He was ordained a year later as a subdeacon on 28 May, a deacon on 24 September, and a priest on 24 December.

He has been described as short but well-made, fair-complexioned, with a chestnut beard, and a slight cast in his eyes.

He left for England on 5 April 1584 and preached with great enthusiasm in York, where he was arrested in spring 1586. Suspicion was raised when a companion appeared to show more deference towards him than someone dressed as a poor man would warrant. He was one of the priests whom Margaret Clitherow was arraigned for harbouring. He was condemned for acting as a priest in England, contrary to the Jesuits, etc. Act 1584, and sentenced to be hanged, drawn and quartered on the Knavesmire at York.

When the sentence was pronounced he exclaimed: "Credo videre bona Domini in terra viventium" ("I believe to see the good things of our Lord: in the land of the living"). At the prison door, while shackles were being fastened on his legs he smilingly said, "I fear me I shall be overproud of my boots."

He was beatified on 22 November 1987 by Pope John Paul II. His brother David, known as "the Fox", was also a staunch Catholic and fled to the Continent.

== See also ==
- Catholic Church in the United Kingdom
- Douai Martyrs
