= Robert Thorpe (priest) =

English Roman Catholic priest and martyr

Robert Thorpe (died 15 May 1591) was an English Roman Catholic priest. He is a Catholic martyr, beatified in 1987.

== Life ==
Thorpe was born in Yorkshire. He reached the English College at Reims 1 March 1584, was ordained deacon in December following, and priest by Cardinal Louis de Guise in April 1585. He was sent on the English mission, 9 May 1585.

He was active in Yorkshire. He was arrested in bed very early on Palm Sunday, 1595, at the house of Thomas Watkinson, at Menthorpe in East Yorkshire. Someone had seen palms being gathered the night before, and informed John Gates of Howden, the nearest justice of the peace.

Watkinson, an old Catholic yeoman who lived a solitary life, is described by John Cecil as a clerk, which the 1913 Catholic Encyclopedia speculates may indicate Cecil's being in minor orders. Thorpe was condemned as a traitor for being a Catholic priest, and was hanged, drawn, and quartered at York. Watkinson, condemned as a felon for harbouring priests, was hanged, despite having been offered his life if he would go to church.

== See also ==
- Douai Martyrs
