= Edward Burden =

English Roman Catholic priest and martyr

Edward Burden (also Borden or Burdon; c.1540–1588) was a sixteenth century recusant priest.

== Biography ==
Born in County Durham, he was a graduate of Corpus Christi College, Oxford. He studied at Duoay College and was ordained a priest in Rheims in 1584. He is probably best known for being one of the Eighty-five martyrs of England and Wales, for, arriving in England in 1586, he was captured two years later and executed by hanging, drawing and quartering in York on 29 November 1588,

He was beatified by Pope John Paul II on 22 November 1987.

== See also ==
- Catholic Church in the United Kingdom
- Douai Martyrs
