= William Spenser =

English Roman Catholic priest and martyr

William Spenser (died 24 September 1589) was an English Roman Catholic priest. He is a Catholic martyr, beatified in 1987.

== Life ==
Spenser was born at Ghisburn, Yorkshire. His maternal uncle, William Horn, who signed for the Rectory of Cornwell, Oxfordshire, in 1559, sent him in 1573 to Trinity College, Oxford, where he became Fellow in 1579 and M.A. in 1580. There, convinced of the truth of Catholicism, he used his position to influence his pupils in that direction; but he delayed his conversion till 1582, when, with four other Trinity men (John Appletree, B.A., already a priest; William Warford, M.A. and Fellow, afterwards a Jesuit; Anthony Shirley, M.A. and Fellow, afterwards a priest; and John Fixer, B.A., afterwards a priest), he embarked from the Isle of Wight.

They landed near Cherbourg, arriving at Reims, 2 November. Received into the Catholic Church five days later, he was ordained sub-deacon and deacon at Laon by the bishop, Valentine Douglas, 7 April 1583, and priest at Reims by the Cardinal Archbishop Louis de Guise, 24 September.

He was sent on the English mission 29 August 1584. He effected the reconciliation of his parents and his uncle (the latter was living as a Catholic priest in 1593), and afterwards voluntarily immured himself in York Castle to help the prisoners there.

He was condemned under 27 Elizabeth, c. 2, for being a priest, and executed at York. With him was executed a layman, Robert Hardesty, who had given him shelter.
