= Nicholas Horner =

Blessed Nicholas Horner
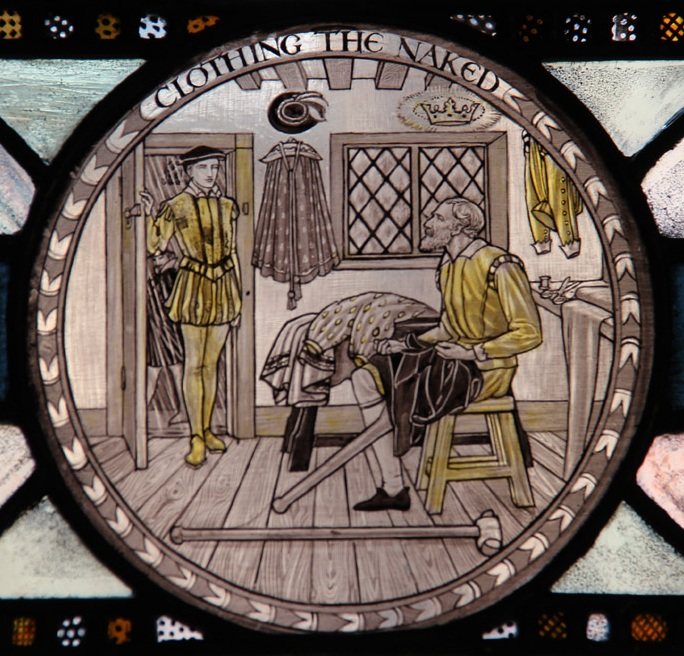
- Detail of a stained glass window in Tyburn Convent by Margaret Agnes Rope

Martyr
- Born: Grantley, Yorkshire, England
- Died: 3 March 1590; Smithfield, London, England
- Venerated in: Roman Catholic Church
- Beatified: 22 November 1987 by Pope John Paul II
- Feast: 22 November

Nicholas Horner (died 3 March 1590) was an English Roman Catholic layman, hanged, drawn and quartered because he had "relieved and assisted" Christopher Bales, a seminary priest. A tailor by trade, he was charged with making a jerkin for a priest. Horner maintained that the customer was a stranger and he didn't know who he was. Horner is recognized as a Catholic martyr, beatified in 1987.

== Life ==
Horner was born at Grantley in Yorkshire. A tailor by trade, he had gone to London to be cured of a wound in his leg. He was arrested on the charge of harbouring Catholic priests and committed to Newgate Prison, where he was kept for a long time close confined in a cell. Due to the heavy fetter on his leg and the deprivation of all medical aid, he contracted blood poisoning in the injured leg which rendered an amputation necessary. During the procedure, he was assisted by John Hewitt, a priest and fellow prisoner, also originally from York.

After a year, he was set free through the efforts of some friends, and worked at his trade at some lodgings at Smithfield. At some point he made the priest Bales a jerkin. When he was again found to be harbouring priests he was cast into Bridewell for harbouring priests and hung up by the wrists till he nearly died.

Horner was convicted of a felony for making a jerkin for a priest, and as he refused to conform to the public worship of the Church of England, was condemned. On the eve of his execution at Smithfield, he had a vision of a crown of glory hanging over his head; the story of this vision was told by him to a friend, who in turn transmitted it by letter to Robert Southwell. He was hanged in front of his lodging in Smithfield, 3 March 1590.
