= Thomas Pormort =

English Roman Catholic priest and martyr

Thomas Pormort (about 1559, probably at Little Limber – executed 29 February 1592, at St. Paul's Churchyard) was an English Roman Catholic priest. He was beatified in 1987.

== Life ==
He was probably related to the family of Pormort of Great Grimsby and Saltfleetby, Lincolnshire. After receiving some education at Cambridge, he went to Reims on 15 January 1581. From there he went to Rome, where he was ordained priest in 1587. He left the English College on 6 March 1588 and entered the household of Owen Lewis, Bishop of Cassano.

On 25 April 1590, Pormort became prefect of studies in the Swiss college at Milan. He was relieved of this office and left for England on 15 September. Crossing the St. Gotthard Pass, he reached Brussels by 29 November. There he became a servant to Mrs. Geoffrey Pole under the name of Whitgift, a name taken from his godfather, the Archbishop of Canterbury, John Whitgift. He went with Pole to Antwerp, intending to proceed to Flushing, and from there to England.

He was arrested in London on 25 July 1591, but managed to escape. In August or September 1591, he was arrested again and committed to Bridewell Prison, before being removed to Richard Topcliffe's house where he was tortured on the rack. On 8 February 1592 he was convicted of high treason for being a seminary priest, and for reconciling a haberdasher named John Barwys to the Catholic Church. He pleaded that he had no faculties but was found guilty.

Pormort accused Topcliffe of having boasted to him of an indecent relationship with Queen Elizabeth I. Topcliffe obtained a court order to proceed with the execution, although Whitgift endeavoured to delay it and make his godson conform to Protestantism. A gibbet was erected in St. Paul's churchyard, and Pormort was kept standing two hours on the ladder while Topcliffe urged him in vain to withdraw his accusation.

== See also ==
- Douai Martyrs
