= William Carter (martyr) =

English printer and Roman Catholic martyr

Blessed William Carter
- Born: 1548; London, England
- Died: 1584; Tyburn, London, England
- Venerated in: Roman Catholic Church
- Beatified: 1987 by John Paul II
- Feast: 11 January

William Carter (c. 1548 – 11 January 1584) was a Roman Catholic English printer and martyr.

== Biography ==
William Carter was born in London in 1548, the son of John Carter, a draper, and Agnes, his wife. He was apprenticed to John Cawood, queen's printer, on Candlemas Day, 1563, for ten years, and afterwards acted as secretary to Nicholas Harpsfield, last Catholic archdeacon of Canterbury, while Harpsfield was a prisoner in Fleet Prison.

On the latter's death he married and set up a press on Tower Hill. In September 1578 he was confined for about a month in the Poultry Compter, a small prison run by a Sheriff in the City of London, apparently for failure to attend divine service as established by act of Parliament. In December 1579 he was committed to the Gatehouse "for not conforming himself in matters of religion". As the prisons were at that time unusually overcrowded he was released on bond in June 1581.

Carter's press printed translations of classics by Thomas a Kempis and Henry Suso, as well as works by Peter Canisius. By that time it had become necessary to provide false information in colophons for safety's sake. "Carter called himself Johannem Bogardi, and claimed his edition of a Peter Canisius book was actually printed in "Duaci" (Douay)."

Among Catholic books he printed a new edition (1000 copies) of Gregory Martin's "A Treatise of Schisme", in 1580, for which he was arrested and imprisoned in the Tower of London, 1582, and paid for his own meals there down to midsummer, 1583. His wife died while he was in prison.

Having been tortured on the rack, he was indicted at the Old Bailey — the central criminal court in England – on 10 January 1584, for having printed Martin's book, which encouraged Catholics to avoid going to Protestant services. There was also a paragraph where confidence was expressed that the Catholic Hope would triumph, and pious Judith would slay Holofernes. This was interpreted as an incitement to assassinate the Queen. At this time, with increasing tensions between Queen Elizabeth I of England and King Philip II of Spain, which would culminate with the sailing of the Spanish Armada four years later, manifestations of Catholic faith in England were often interpreted as a treasonable taking the side of the Spanish enemy and punished accordingly. He was executed for treason at Tyburn the next day.
