= Patrick Primrose =

Scottish priest

- Born: c. 1605
- Died: 1671, Banff, Scotland
- Occupation: Priest
- Known for: Martyrdom
- Title: Vicar General, royal chaplain

Patrick Primrose OP (c. 1605–1671) was a Scottish Dominican priest of the Roman Catholic Church, Scottish Vicar General, and royal chaplain to Queen Catherine of Braganza, who died in 1671 after being jailed for two months over winter for celebrating Mass.

== Biography ==
Patrick Primrose graduated from the University of Edinburgh in 1631. He was admitted to the Faculty of Advocates, that is, licensed to practice law, on 15 January 1635. He was ordained a priest of the Dominican Order. He was in Italy as early as 1649 and was named the Dominican's Vicar General for Scotland on 8 November 1651, the only person ever to hold that title. His appointment to that position required special dispensation because he had not been a Dominican for 12 years as required. He worked first in the Lothians and then in Banffshire.

After King Charles II was restored in 1660, Primrose was appointed a royal chaplain to his Catholic consort, Queen Catherine of Braganza, in the hope that this would allow him some freedom to exercise his Catholic ministry.

He was taken into custody at the Tolbooth of Banff and held for two months in the winter of 1670 for holding Mass. The Domestic Annals of Scotland describe how several months passed after his imprisonment before he was identified as a servant of the Queen. Primrose was then released on condition that he exile himself. The authorities later allowed that he was prevented from leaving by ill health, likely caused by the conditions of his imprisonment. He was granted permission to remain in Scotland until 5 February 1671. The date of his death is unknown, being ambiguously referred to as "the late prisoner" when given the extended period to remain.

He is sometimes reported to have died in prison, although the location of his death is at most uncertain.

He was buried in the grounds of the pre-Reformation church of St. Peter, Drumdelgie, at the River Deveron near Milton of Strathbogie (now Huntly) in the former parish of Botary. His monument there was ordered demolished by the authorities, citing the penal laws, on 4 March 1672.

The Dominicans of Edinburgh retain Primrose's chalice, identified by an inscription on its base.

== See also ==
- Forty Martyrs of England and Wales
- List of Catholic martyrs of the English Reformation
