= Jesuits, etc. Act 1584 =

Act of the Parliament of England

- Act of Parliament
- Parliament of England
- Long title: An act against Jesuits, seminary priests, and such other like disobedient persons.
- Citation: 27 Eliz. 1. c. 2
- Territorial extent: England and Wales; Isle of Man

Dates
- Royal assent: 14 September 1585
- Commencement: 24 October 1585 (Note: Section 1. 40 days from the end of the session.)
- Repealed: England and Wales: 9 August 1844; Isle of Man: 25 July 1991
Other legislation
Amended by	Popery Act 1698
Repealed by	England and Wales: Roman Catholics Act 18444; Isle of Man: Statute Law Revision (Isle of Man) Act 1991
Relates to	Act of Supremacy 1558; Papists Act 1778; Roman Catholic Relief Act 1791

Status: Repealed

Text of statute as originally enacted

The Jesuits, etc. Act 1584 (27 Eliz. 1. c. 2) was an act of the Parliament of England passed during the English Reformation. The act commanded all Roman Catholic priests to leave the country within 40 days or they would be punished for high treason, unless within the 40 days, they swore an oath to obey the Queen. Those who harboured them, and all those who knew of their presence and failed to inform the authorities, would be fined and imprisoned for felony, or if the authorities wished to make an example of them, they might be executed for treason.

Anyone who was brought up as a Jesuit overseas (i.e. if he were educated abroad in a Jesuit seminary) had to return to England within six months, and then within two days of arriving swear to submit to the Queen and also take the oath required by the Act of Supremacy 1558 (1 Eliz. 1. c. 1). Failure to do so was treason. Any person who did take the oath was forbidden from coming within 10 miles of the Queen for 10 years unless he had her personal written permission. Again, failure to observe this requirement was treason. Priests already within England had 40 days to depart, although this was by grace, not a right, and could be withdrawn, as it was for example during the Popish Plot.

== Enforcement of the act ==
=== Under Elizabeth I ===
The act was enforced with great severity in the last decades of Elizabeth's reign. It may be that at first, the English Government believed that deporting priests would be an adequate solution to the Catholic problem (this was certainly to be King James I's view later): if so they quickly decided that harsher measures were necessary. About 200 English Catholics perished between 1584 and 1603, of whom the great majority were priests, despite the Government's protests that no one was being persecuted solely on account of their religion. The justification for rigorous enforcement of the statute was that during the war with Spain, the loyalty of all English Catholics, and especially priests, must be regarded as suspect. However, the defeat of the Spanish Armada in 1588 did not, as might have been expected, lead to the relaxation of the persecution, as the war with Spain dragged on into the next reign.

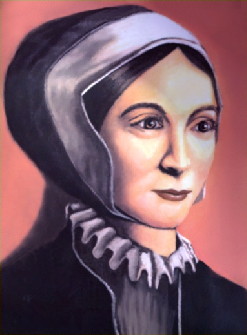
Margaret Clitherow

Of the laity who suffered under the Jesuits, etc. Act 1584, probably the best known is Margaret Clitherow of York. Charged in 1586 with harbouring priests, (among them Francis Ingleby) she refused to plead to her indictment (probably to shield her children from being interrogated or tortured), and was executed by the gruesome process of peine forte et dure (being pressed to death). Such severity towards a lay person, especially a woman, was unusual. For example, there is no record of any legal proceedings being taken against Anne, Lady Arundell, widow of Sir John Arundell of Lanherne, for harbouring the Catholic martyr Father John Cornelius, who was executed in 1594: Lady Arundell retrieved his body to give him a proper burial.

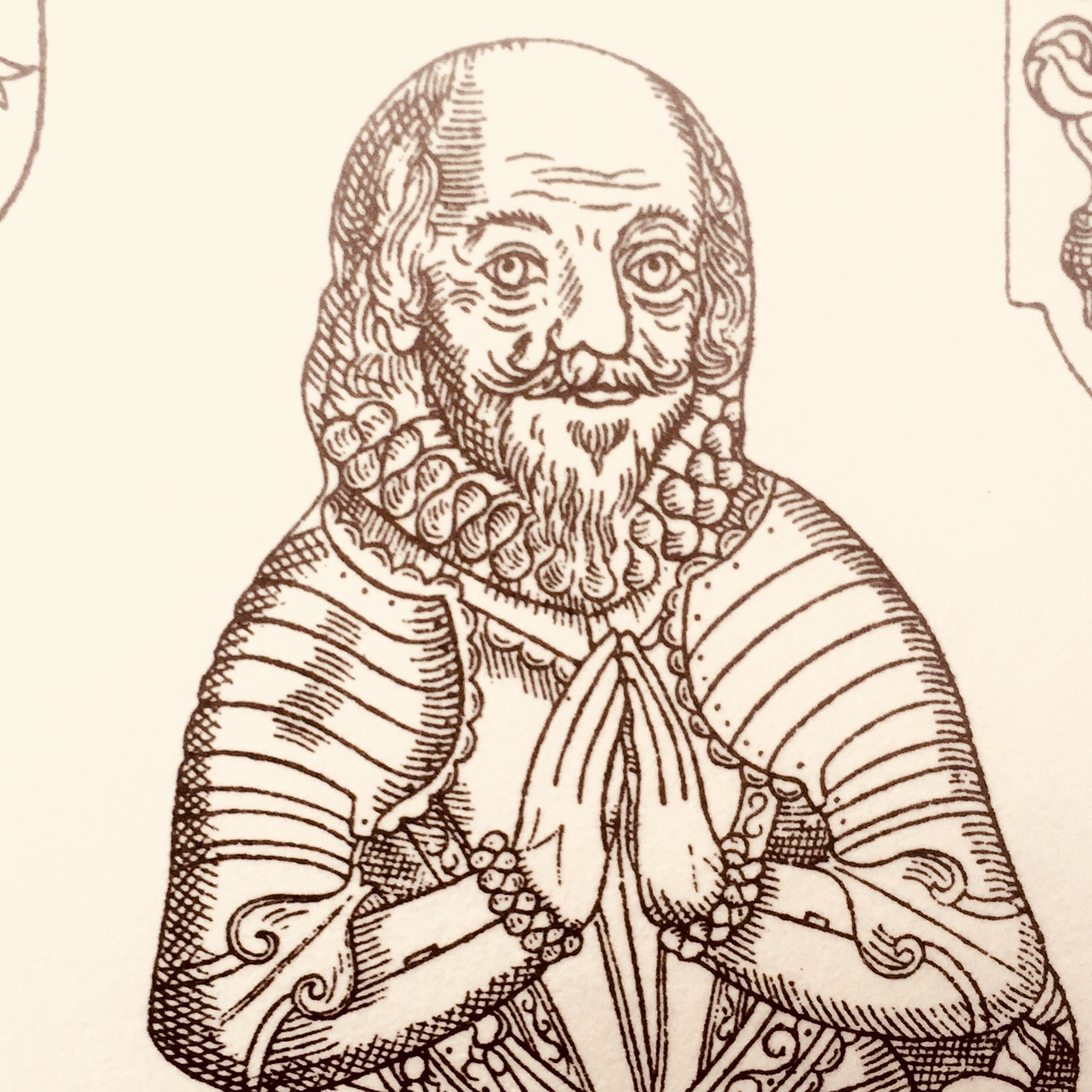
Sir John Arundell of Lanherne: he and his wife, Lady Anne Stanley, were the patrons of the Catholic martyr John Cornelius, whom they harboured in their house in breach of the 1584 Act

=== After Elizabeth I ===
After the death of Elizabeth I in 1603, the statute gradually fell into disuse. The Stuart dynasty which succeeded her was in general disposed to religious toleration, and the Treaty of London of 1604 which ended the Anglo-Spanish War removed one obvious justification for persecution, as it could no longer be argued that English Catholics were potential agents for a hostile foreign power.

James I felt it politically prudent to give his assent to the Jesuits etc. Act 1603, which strengthened the statute of 1584, and as a result, a number of priests were put to death, of whom probably the best known is Father John Sugar. However, the King by his own admission was opposed to the execution of priests. There was a brief revival of anti-Catholic sentiment caused by the discovery of the Gunpowder Plot in 1605, but it seems to have largely died away by 1612. Robert Cecil, 1st Earl of Salisbury, the dominant figure in the English government from 1603 to 1612, detested the Jesuits, but admitted that he had qualms about enforcing the statute of 1584 against other priests, most of whom he thought were loyal enough at heart. King James shared these scruples, saying that he thought banishment a sufficient punishment.

Prosecutions of members of the Catholic laity for harbouring priests ceased after about 1616, as Protestant sheriffs and justices of the peace were notably unwilling to enforce the law against their Catholic neighbours. A blatant example of this unwillingness was the Welsh squire Thomas Gunter of Gunter Mansion, Abergavenny, who, in 1678, told the local vicar cheerfully that "he had kept a priest in Oliver Cromwell's time, and would keep one now". This tolerant attitude made it impossible to enforce the Penal Laws against the upper classes: in 1613 the justices of the peace of Northamptonshire remarked casually that due to their high regard for Sir Thomas Brudenell (later the 1st Earl of Cardigan), they had repeatedly dismissed charges of recusancy against him and numerous other members of his family.

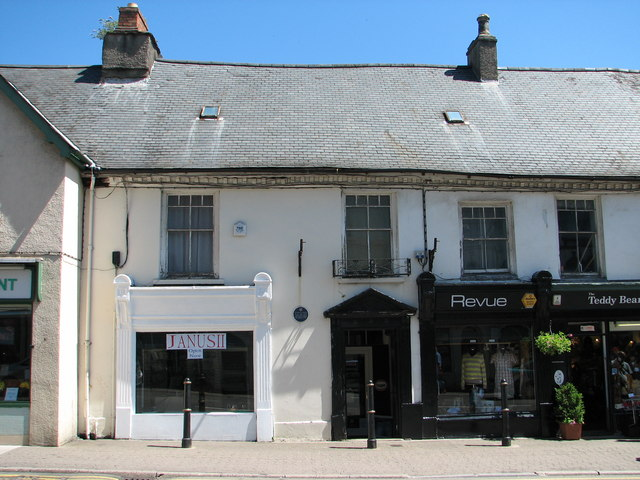
Gunter Mansion, Abergavenny, where Catholic priests were sheltered for generations, in defiance of the 1584 statute

No priests were executed in the period 1618–1625, only one was executed in the period 1625–1640, and after a brief revival of stringent persecution during the English Civil War, only two more were executed between 1646 and 1660.

=== The Popish Plot ===
Following the Restoration of Charles II, under the tolerant rule of a monarch who was himself inclined to the Catholic religion, the Government was content to periodically issue orders for all priests to leave England, without any expectation that the orders would be complied with. The statute of 1584 was regarded as effectively a dead letter, until the outbreak of the Popish Plot in the autumn of 1678 led to its unexpected revival. Despite the King's known Catholic sympathies, the public atmosphere of hysteria was such that he had no choice but to revert to strict enforcement of the Penal Laws. Under a Proclamation of 20 November 1678 all priests were to be arrested. They were to be denied the usual 40 days of grace to leave the country: instead, they were to be held in prison "in order to their trial". As J.P. Kenyon remarks, these five simple words launched a vicious pogrom against the Catholic priesthood which continued for the next two years. Priests who had been working undisturbed in England for decades suddenly found themselves facing the death penalty.

In theory, Scots and Irish priests were exempt from the statute, if they could show that their presence in England was temporary. Even during the Popish Plot, a number of priests were acquitted on that ground, although the Irish Franciscan Father Charles Mahoney was executed in 1679, despite his plea that at the time of his arrest, he was passing through England on his way to France. An Irish priest might also be able to plead that he had signed the Remonstrance of 1671, by which he gave his primary allegiance to the King, not the Pope. These priests, known as the Remonstrants, were left in peace even at the height of the Plot hysteria.

Although it was not technically a defence under the statute of 1584, a priest who could prove that he had taken the Oath of Allegiance to the Crown was unofficially entitled to a reprieve: Charles Carne, Andrew Bromwich and Lionel Anderson were among those who successfully pleaded that they had taken the Oath. During the Plot pleas for clemency were generally rejected out of hand, but in a few cases, such as David Kemiss and William Atkins, the accused was spared the death penalty on the grounds of extreme old age. Even the vehemently anti-Catholic Lord Chief Justice Sir William Scroggs approved of the Crown showing mercy in such cases, in order "that the world may not say that we are grown barbarous and inhumane".

No serious effort was made to revive prosecutions of the laity for harbouring priests. The Government did issue two proclamations reminding the public that this was a felony which in theory rendered them liable to the death penalty, but no action was taken against those laymen, like Thomas Gunter, Gervaise Pierrepont, Sir John Southcote and Sir James Poole, 1st Baronet, in whose houses priests were arrested.

Anti-Catholic sentiment gradually died away, more speedily in the provinces where many of the priests who died were venerable and respected local figures. In June 1679 the King issued an order that all priests condemned under the statute of 1584 after 4 June should be reprieved until his further will was known. Kenyon suggests that the Government at this point simply had no idea what to do next. In the event, the reprieve for priests condemned after that date became permanent. This however was too late to save those already condemned, and over the summer of 1679, despite mounting public unease, at least fourteen priests were executed or died in prison. Persecution continued to wane in 1680: at least ten more priests were prosecuted under the statute of 1584, but it seems that all of them were acquitted or reprieved.

=== After the Plot ===
Under the openly Catholic King James II, all persecution of Catholics ceased early in 1685. A revival of anti-Catholic feeling after the Glorious Revolution of 1688 caused the Government to pass one final Penal Law, the Popery Act 1698 ( 11 Will. 3. c. 4). This sought to strengthen the statute of 1584 by providing that anyone who apprehended a Catholic priest should receive a reward of £100: in effect, this was a bounty for catching priests. The severity of this provision was mitigated by Section III, commuting the death sentence for priests to perpetual imprisonment.

There is little evidence that the 1698 act was enforced strictly. Kenyon suggests that the obvious decline in numbers of the English Catholic community in the eighteenth century was due to financial penalties, such as the double land tax imposed on Catholics in 1692, rather than to overt persecution.

== The end of the Penal Laws ==
The "bounty" provisions of the 1698 act were repealed by the first Catholic relief measure, the Papists Act 1778 (18 Geo. 3. c. 60). However, the 1778 act produced a revival of anti-Catholic feelings which erupted in the Gordon Riots of 1780, in which hundreds of people died. This reaction may have delayed further relief measures, but by 1791 the Government felt it safe to finally legalise the Catholic priesthood. Under the Roman Catholic Relief Act 1791 (31 Geo. 3. c. 32) the Elizabethan Laws were repealed, and it became lawful, although under strictly controlled conditions, to act as a priest in England and to celebrate Mass.

The whole act was repealed for England and Wales by section 1 of the Roman Catholics Act 1844 (7 & 8 Vict. c. 102), which came into force on 9 August 1844.

The whole act was repealed for the Isle of Man by section 1(2) of, and schedule 2 to, the Statute Law Revision (Isle of Man) Act 1991, which came into force on 25 July 1991.

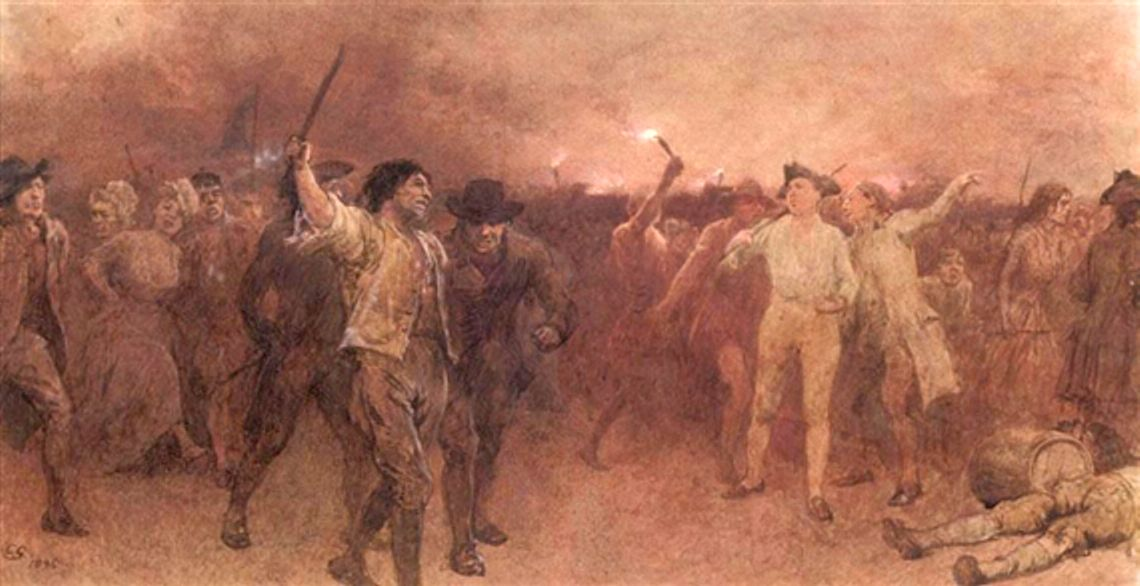
The Gordon Riots 1780, painting by Charles Green

== 1995 court case ==
The execution of a Catholic priest under the act in 1594 became the subject of a court case 401 years later. In 1995 a church applied to the consistory court in Durham for a faculty (planning permission) to display a memorial plaque on the church door, in memory of the dead priest. Even though the 1584 act had been repealed long ago, the priest's conviction had not been quashed, and so the court could not permit it:

in the absence of a posthumous pardon the court could not properly sanction a memorial to a person lawfully convicted of high treason; and that, accordingly, since no question had been raised as to the legal propriety either of the priest's conviction as a traitor or his execution and there had been no pardon, the faculty sought could not be granted, notwithstanding the subsequent repeal of the act of 1584.

In 2008 the Oxford Consistory Court (presided over by the same judge) declined to follow that case as a precedent, on the grounds that "that decision had failed to take account of the commemoration of English saints and martyrs of the Reformation era in the Church of England's calendar of festivals. As such a commemoration was permitted in an authorised service, it would have been inconsistent not to permit commemoration of similar persons by a memorial."

== See also ==
- High treason in the United Kingdom
- Religion Act 1580
- Safety of the Queen, etc. Act 1584 (27 Eliz.1, c. 1)
- Penal law (British)
