= Errington (surname) =

Errington is a surname found in the English-speaking world. Originating from a now-vanished settlement in Northumberland, claims that it is derived from a British river name akin to Welsh arian ‘silvery bright’ + Old English tūn ‘enclosure settlement’ are erroneous as the village predated the river. The "Erring" is derived from "Errean" a Saxon warlord who was the Chief of the settlement. Source: Dictionary of American Family Names 2nd edition, 2022

== Notable people with this name ==
- Anthony Errington (died 1719), an English divine
- Cyril Errington (born 1992), a Salvadoran-born Nicaraguan professional footballer
- Elizabeth Errington, a British archaeologist and numismatist
- Sir Eric Errington, 1st Baronet (1900–1973), a British barrister and Conservative Party politician
- Frank R. Errington (1890–1958), a British diver who competed in the 1908 Summer Olympics
- George Errington (bishop) (1804–1886), a Roman Catholic churchman, Bishop of Plymouth 1851–55, Coadjutor Archbishop of Westminster 1855–60
- George Errington (martyr) (died 1596), an English Roman Catholic martyr, hanged, drawn and quartered at York, beatified 1987
- Sir George Errington, 1st Baronet (1839–1920), an Irish politician, MP for County Longford 1874–85
- General Sir Henry Errington Longden (1819–1890), a British Army officer who served as Adjutant-General in India.
- Harry Errington (1910–2004), the only London firefighter to be awarded the George Cross during the Second World War
- Jeffery Errington, a British microbiologist
- John Edward Errington (1806–1862), an English civil engineer
- John Errington Moss (born 1940), a Canadian novelist
- Lancelot Errington (1657–1745), an 18th-century Northumbrian noted for his capture of Lindisfarne during the Jacobite Rising of 1715
- Lindsay Errington, a Scottish art historian and former keeper at the National Gallery of Scotland
- Nicolas Errington (died 1593), an English soldier
- Paul Lester Errington (1902–1962), an American conservationist and professor
- Ralph Errington (1886 – 1958), a British diver who competed in the 1908 Summer Olympics
- Robert Malcolm Errington (born 1939), a British historian who studied ancient Greece and the Classical world
- Shelly E. Errington (born 1944), a cultural anthropologist specializing in the studies of plastic art and narrative arts
- Sue E. Errington (born 1942), a Democratic member of the Indiana Senate, representing the 26th District since 2006
- William Errington (1699–1739), High Sheriff of Northumberland
- William Errington (1716–1768), an English Roman Catholic priest, the founder of Sedgley Park School
- William Errington Hume (1879–1960), a British physician and cardiologist
- Mark Errington Brydon (born 1960), an English musician best known as a member of the group Moloko
- Heavy D (Dwight Errington Myers, 1967–2011), a Jamaican American rapper, singer and leader of Heavy D & the Boyz
- Errington Ridley Liddell Keen (1910–1984), also known as Eric Keen, an English football player and manager
- John Miles (born John Errington; 1949–2021), an English musician best known for his 1976 hit "Music (Was my First Love)"
- Spragga Benz (born Carlton Errington Grant 1969), a Jamaican dancehall Deejay

== See also ==
- The Errington baronets, three baronetcies of England or the United Kingdom
- Errington (disambiguation)
