= St Mary's Church, Brownsea Island =

Church in Dorset, England

St Mary's Church
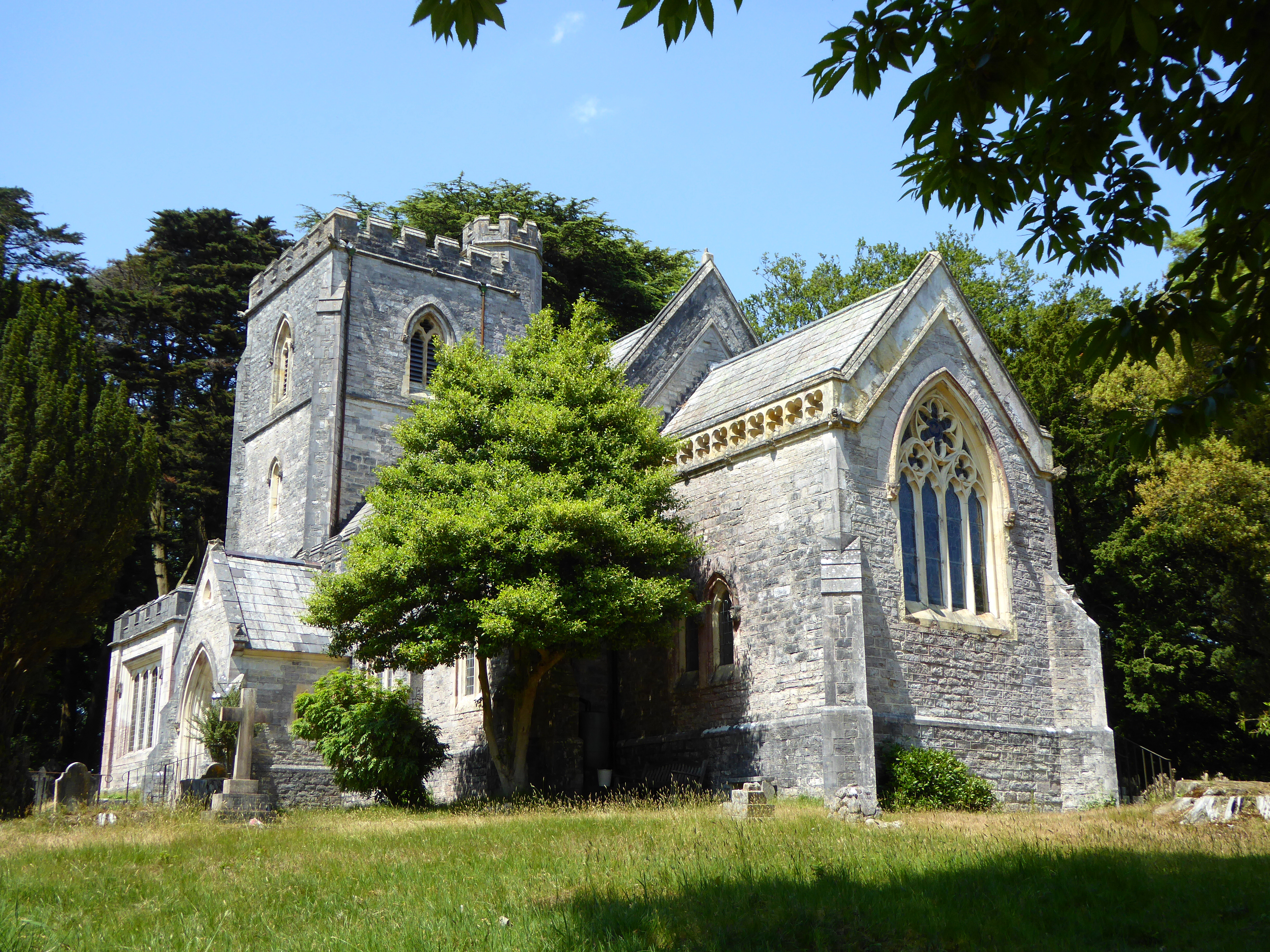

Religion
- Affiliation: Church of England
- Ecclesiastical or organizational status: Active
- Year consecrated: 1854

Location
- Location: Brownsea Island, Dorset, England
- Interactive map of St Mary's Church
- Coordinates: 50.6895°N 1.9614°W

Architecture
- Architect: Branchard
- Type: Church

St Mary's Church is a Church of England parish church at Brownsea Island, Dorset, England. The church was built in 1853–54 and is a Grade II* listed building.

== History ==
A church for Brownsea Island was built after Colonel William Petrie Waugh purchased the island in 1852 and established a pottery industry (Branksea Clay & Pottery Company) there, along with Maryland village to house his workers. With the island's new inhabitants at Brownsea Castle and Maryland, as well as existing coastguard station, Waugh had St Mary's built in 1853–54 at his sole expense. In addition to paying for its construction, he also provided the church with an annual endowment of £75, with the government providing an additional £25 due to the coastguard station. Designed by the architect Mr. Blanchard and built by Charles Wheeler, the foundation stone of the new church was laid by Sir Harry Smith, 1st Baronet on 2 July 1853. The ceremony attracted over 1,000 spectators, most of whom were brought over to the island from Poole but also Studland. Prior to the church, the Bishop of Salisbury, the Right Rev. Edward Denison, granted permission in about 1847 for the rector of Studland to use a sail loft at Brownsea Island's coastguard station for divine service on alternate Wednesdays.

St Mary's was consecrated by the Bishop of Salisbury, the Right Rev. Walter Kerr Hamilton, on 18 October 1854. The ceremony was attended by many spectators and despite the church's 150 person capacity, 306 tickets of admission were given for the consecration. The church cost £10,000 to build. In 1908, a small chapel was added onto the church to hold the marble tomb effigy of Charles van Raalte, who owned the island from 1901 until his death in 1908. He was originally buried in the churchyard on 15 February, but was moved into the tomb later in the year after a faculty for the chapel was obtained and construction carried out.

When Mary Bonham-Christie purchased Brownsea Island in 1927, most of the island's residents were evicted and St Mary's fell into disuse. Bonham-Christie would then ban all public access to the island after a serious wildfire occurred in 1934. During World War II, the western side of Brownsea Island was used as a Starfish site, a night-time decoy intended to divert German bombers away from Poole. In 1942, the church suffered bomb damage during an air raid and repair work was quickly carried out in the same year. After Bonham-Christie's death, the National Trust purchased the island in 1962 and, with the exception of the castle, it was reopened to the public on 15 May 1963. The ceremony included the rehallowing of St Mary's, which once again began to hold services.

St Mary's remains the parish church for Brownsea Island, as part of the benefice of Parkstone St Peter and St Osmund with Branksea St Mary. Sunday afternoon services are held each week from Easter to the end of September and the church is also open to visitors to Brownsea Island. The church maintains a strong link with the Brownsea Island Scout camp. In 2007, to coincide with the Scouting centenary, about 40 new kneelers or hassocks were given to the church, decorated with the 21 World Scout Jamboree badges and other Scouting, Guiding and island badges.

== Architecture and fittings ==
St Mary's is built of coursed rubble stone with slate roofs, and is made up of a nave, chancel, north vestry, south porch, west tower and south chapel. The church's three-stage square tower has a battlemented parapet and is surmounted by a small octagonal turret on its north side. It originally held four bells, cast by John Warner & Sons of Spitalfields. In 1980, all of the bells were removed for recasting into eight bells at the Whitechapel Bell Foundry in London and they were then rehung in the tower on a new steel frame. The Royal Marines were responsible for transporting the bells from and back to the church.

The nave is separated from both the tower and chancel by identical perforated oak screens. It has an arch-braced roof and contains its original carved open seats, as well as original fittings such as the font, built of Purbeck Marble with an oak cover, pulpit and reading desk. On the north wall are two carved panels of 17th century date. The church's organ dates to 1863 and was installed in St Mary's on 27 April 1988 to replace the old harmonium, although the latter was retained and is still sometimes used during services. The chancel has a wagon roof, carved oak panelling on its walls and Purbeck Marble paving. The altar is of stone and marble. There are tablets on carved oak frames which are inscribed with the Apostles' Creed, the Ten Commandments and the Lord's Prayer. The vestry adjoins the chancel on the north side.

The Waugh family pew was placed in the tower section of the church. It originally held ten carved oak chairs, five with the arms of Mrs. Waugh's family and five with the arms of Colonel Waugh. In the middle of the pew was an octagonal table. The walls of the pew have carved oak panelling and the roof is made from part of the 16th century roof of the Council Chamber of Crosby Hall in London. The family pew holds its original fireplace, above which is a 17th-century oil painting of the Crucifixion of Jesus. It is flanked by two carved figures on the wall, both dating to the 16th century, with one representing "Susannah and the Elders" and the other the "Offering of the Wise Men".

All of the interior's original carvings, including the pulpit and reading desk, were carried out by Mr. G. Gynne of Soho, while tablets, inscriptions and stained glass windows were made by Messrs. Baillie and Mayer. The four-light east window illustrates different scenes in the life of Christ: the transfiguration, the crucifixion, the descent from the Cross and the Ascension of our Lord. The upper part of the window has glass representing the dove descending, surrounded by glory, and emblems of Alpha and Omega. The south window depicts the four evangelists and the west three-light window illustrates Christ blessing little children. In the tower section is a three-light window of plain glass, with three quatrefoil windows of stained glass above.

After purchasing Brownsea Island in 1873, George Augustus Cavendish-Bentink lavished the church with a number of additional fittings, including two marble figures depicting winged angels. They originally formed part of an altar in Santa Lucia Church in Venice, which was demolished in 1861. Cavendish-Bentink died in 1891 and was buried in the churchyard. His place of burial, along with his wife, who died in 1896, is marked by a monument which has an Italian well-head as its base, over which is an ornamental iron arch with a bronze plaque. The well-head has the crest of Leze family. The monument is now a Grade II listed structure.

== Vicarage ==
The Villa, a residence north of the church, was built as the vicarage, but it was never occupied for this purpose. Instead, it was put up for auction by creditors in 1857, along with the rest of the island, after the Waughs' industrial venture there proved a failure and the family fled to Spain. The vicarage was eventually sold off with the rest of the island in 1873. The Villa, which became a Grade II listed building in 2009, now serves as the Villa Wildlife Centre for Dorset Wildlife Trust.
