= Brownsea Island Scout camp =

1907 location of experimental scout camp

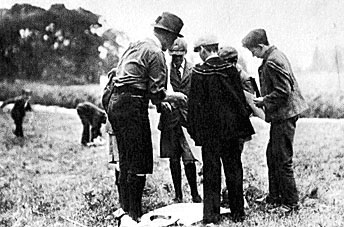
- Robert Baden-Powell with boys of experimental scout camp on Brownsea Island
- Owner: National Trust
- Location: Poole Harbour
- Country: England
- Coordinates: 50°41′18″N 1°58′45″W
- Founded: 1 August 1907

Brownsea Island Scout camp is a historic Scout campsite on Brownsea Island in Poole Harbour in southern England, which was the site of Robert Baden-Powell's 1907 experimental camp for boys to test ideas for his book Scouting for Boys, which led to the rapid growth of the Scout movement. Boys from different social backgrounds participated from 29 July to 9 August 1907 in activities around camping, observation, woodcraft, chivalry, lifesaving and patriotism.

Boy Scout camped on the island until the early 1930s. In 1963, a formal 50-acre (20 ha) Scout campsite was created after the island became a nature conservation area owned by the National Trust. In 1973, a Scout Jamboree with six hundred Scouts was held on the island. On 1 August 2007, a centenary of Scouting event, including four Scout camps and a Sunrise Ceremony, took place at the Brownsea Island Scout camp on the 100th anniversary of the start of the experimental encampment.

== 1907 experimental Scout camp ==
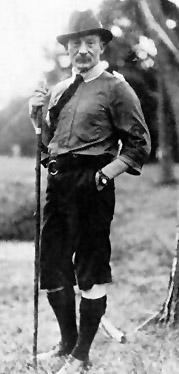
Robert Baden-Powell at Brownsea Island, 1907

Robert Baden-Powell became famous for the October 1899 to May 1900 defence of Mafeking during the Boer War. The Mafeking Cadet Corps of boys, aged 12 to 15, acted as messengers during the siege and impressed Baden-Powell. Baden-Powell had written the books Reconnaissance and Scouting (1884) and Aids to Scouting for NCOs and Men (1899, sent from Mafeking in the last post out) for military training, but were used by teachers and youth organisations. After the war, Baden-Powell suggested training boys in scouting and, while writing Scouting for Boys, to test his ideas, held an experimental camp on Brownsea Island in 1907.

Following the camp, Baden-Powell went on a speaking tour arranged by his publisher, Pearsons, to promote his forthcoming book, Scouting for Boys. It was initially published as six fortnightly installments (as the publisher was not convinced that it would sell well), beginning in January 1908; later it came out as a book which is still in print, and one of the top "best sellers" ever. The Scout movement spread throughout Great Britain and Ireland and countries of the British Empire and soon to the rest of the world.

=== Site ===
Brownsea Island has 560 acres (2.3 km^{2}) of woodland and open areas and features two lakes. The camp was isolated from the mainland and the press but only a short ferry trip from Poole, making for easy logistics.

=== Participants ===
Baden-Powell invited boys from different social backgrounds to the camp, an unusual idea during the class-conscious Edwardian era. Eleven came from the well-to-do public schools of Eton and Harrow, mostly sons of Baden-Powell's friends. Seven came from the Boys' Brigade at Bournemouth, and three came from the Brigade at Poole & Hamworthy. Baden-Powell's nine-year-old nephew Donald Baden-Powell also attended. The camp fee was dependent on means: one pound (equivalent to £79.75 in 2018) for the public school boys, and three shillings and sixpence (£0.18 in decimal currency; equivalent to £14.360 in 2018) for the others.

It is uncertain if 20 or 21 boys attended the camp. At least four authors list attendance at 20 boys, and that they were organized into four patrols with Baden-Powell's nephew Donald as camp orderly. These sources included an article in The Scout (1908), Sir Percy Everett in The First Ten Years (1948) and Rover Word (1936), and E. E. Reynolds in The Scout Movement (1950). In 1964, William Hillcourt added the fourth Rodney brother, Simon, in Two Lives of a Hero, bringing the total to 21. This evidence was supported by the oldest Rodney brother, then the 8th Baron Rodney. The reasons why Simon Rodney was not listed by the other authors is not clear but evidence that he was present and the 6th member of the Curlews Patrol, was recounted by Scouting historian Colin Walker.

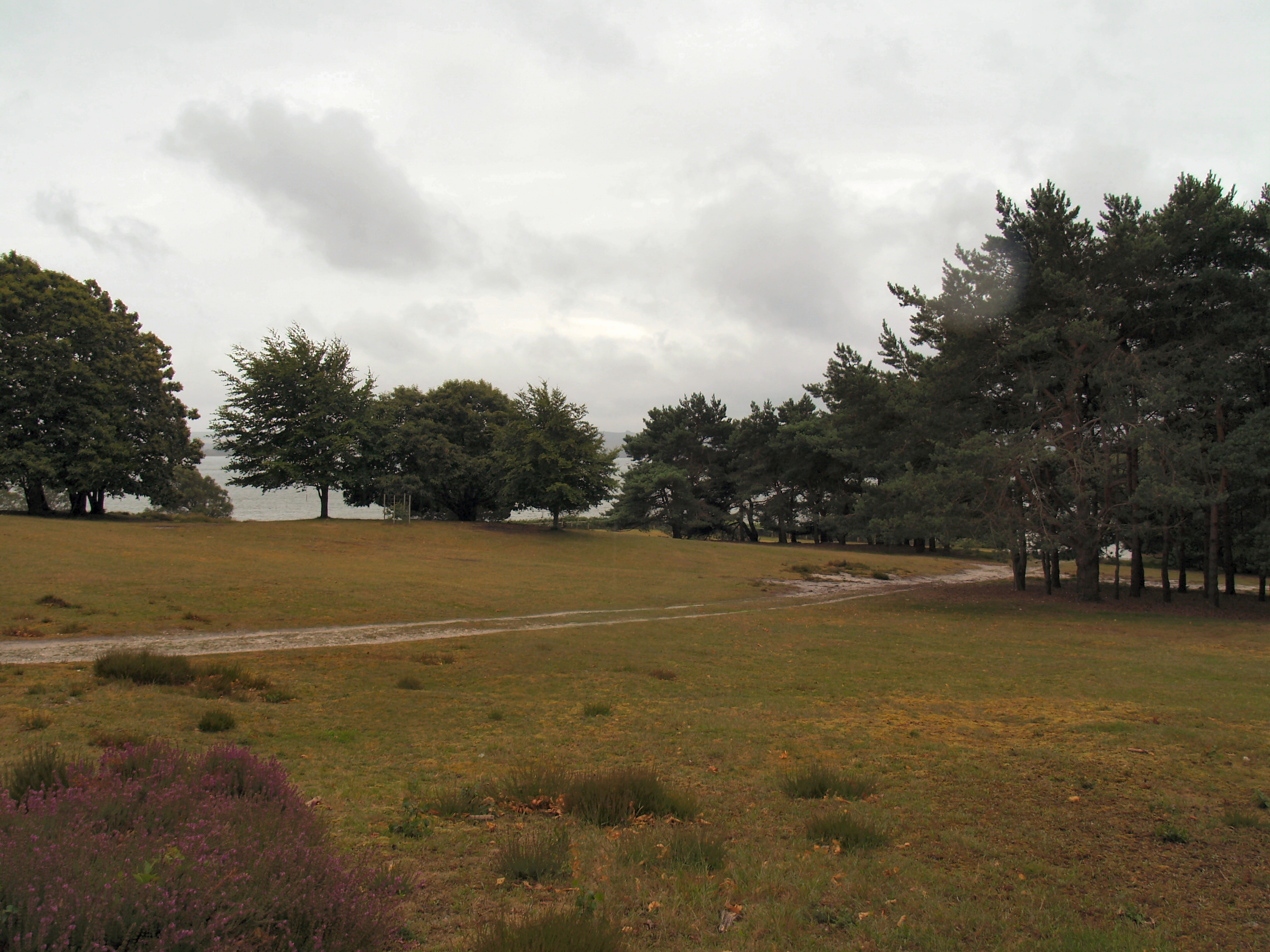
Site of the camping area on Brownsea Island

=== Organisation ===
The boys were organised into four patrols, designated as the Wolves, Ravens, Bulls and Curlews.

The boys did not have uniforms but wore khaki scarves. They were presented with brass fleur-de-lis badges, similar to British Army scout badges. They wore a coloured knot on their shoulder indicating their patrol: green for Bulls, blue for Wolves, yellow for Curlews, and red for Ravens and each patrol leader carried a staff with a flag depicting the patrol animal. After passing tests on knots, tracking and the national flag, they were given another brass badge, a scroll with the words Be Prepared, to wear below the fleur-de-lis.

=== Programme ===
Each patrol camped in a bell tent. The camp began each day with a blast from a kudu horn that Baden-Powell had found in the Somabula forest during the Matabele campaign of 1896. He used the same kudu horn to open the Coming of Age Jamboree 22 years later in 1929. The day began at 6:00 am, with cocoa, exercises, flag break and prayers, followed by breakfast at 8:00 am. Then followed the morning exercise of the subject of the day, as well as bathing, if deemed necessary. After lunch there was a strict siesta (no talking allowed), followed by the afternoon activity based on the subject of the day. At 5:00 p.m. the day ended with games, supper, campfire yarns and prayers. Baden-Powell made full use of his personal fame as the hero of the siege of Mafeking. For many of the participants, the highlights of the camp were his campfire yarns of his African experiences, and the Zulu "Ingonyama" chant, translating to "he is a lion". Turning in for the night was compulsory for every patrol at 9:00 pm, regardless of age.

Each day was based on a different theme: Day 1 was preliminary, day 2 was campaigning, day 3 was observation, day 4 for woodcraft, day 5 was chivalry, day 6 was saving a life, day 7 was patriotism, and day 8 was the conclusion. The participants left by ferry on the 9th day, 9 August 1907. The camp cost £55 two shillings, and eight pence; after the boys' fees, and donations totaling £16, this left a deficit of just over £24. The deficit was cleared by Saxton Noble, whose two sons Marc and Humphrey had attended. Baden-Powell considered the camp successful.

== Commemorations of 1907 camp ==
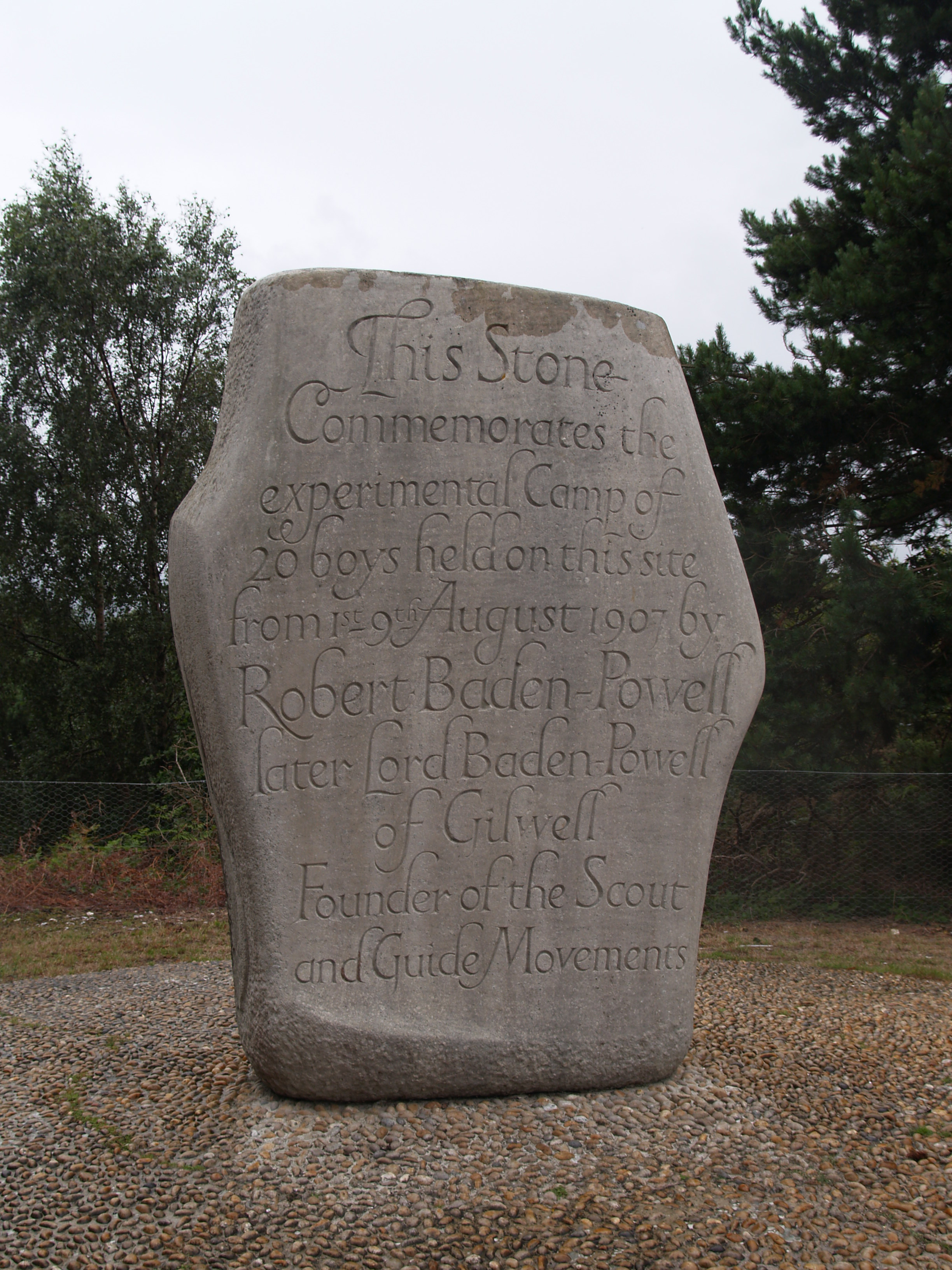
Stone on Brownsea Island commemorating the first Scout camp

A reunion of the original campers was held in 1928 at Baden-Powell's home, Pax Hill in Hampshire. A stone commemorating the camp, by sculptor Don Potter, was unveiled near the camp on 1 August 1967 by Baden-Powell's daughter, Betty Clay. In May 2000, twenty trees, one for each boy who had attended the first camp, were planted on the seaward side of the original site by The Scout Association's Chief Commissioner and Scouts and Guides. The trees were to provide future windbreaks against coastal winds.

== Campsite history ==
=== From 1927 to 2000 ===
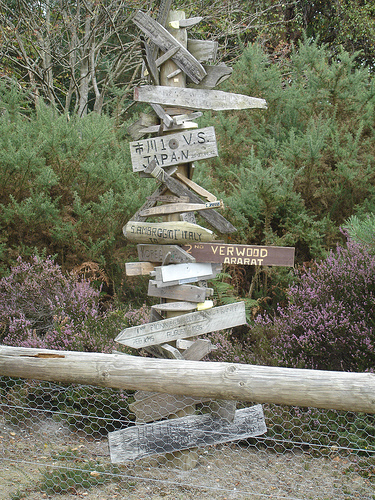
Scout signpost on Brownsea Island

After the death of owner of Brownsea Island, Charles van Raalte in 1907, his wife Florence stayed on the island until 1925. Mary Bonham-Christie bought the island at an auction in 1927. In 1932, Bonham-Christie allowed 500 Scouts to camp there to celebrate the Silver Jubilee of Scouting but shortly afterwards she closed the island to the public and it became very overgrown. In 1934, some Sea Scouts were camping on the island when a fire broke out. The fire engulfed most of the island, burning west to east. The eastern buildings were only saved by a change in wind direction. Although the fire did not start where the Sea Scouts were camping and it was not known how the fire started, Bonham-Christie blamed the Sea Scouts for the fire and she did not allow Scouts to camp on the island again. When Bonham-Christie died in 1961, her family became liable for death duties on her estate, so the island was put up for sale. Interested citizens, who feared that the island would be bought by developers, helped raise an endowment and, in 1962, the government allowed the National Trust to take over management of the island in lieu of the death duties.

In 1963, the National Trust, opened the island to the public. In the opening ceremony, Olave Baden-Powell planted a mulberry tree. The Trust has maintained the island as a conservation area. In 1964, 50 acres (20 ha) near the original campsite were set aside for Scout and Guide camping. The 1st and 9th Seaford Scouts camped near the site, having been told they were the first to do so do so since Robert Baden-Powell. In 1967 the Scout Association held a patrol leaders' camp on the island for the Diamond Jubilee of Scouting from 29 to 5 July August. In 1973, a jamboree was held on the island for 600 Scouts from seven nations, along with one of the original campers, then aged 81.

=== After 2000 ===
Since 2000, the National Trust has maintained the Scout and Guide campsite, South Shore Lodge and the Baden-Powell Outdoor Centre where members of Brownsea Island Scout Fellowship and Friends of Guiding operate a small trading post.

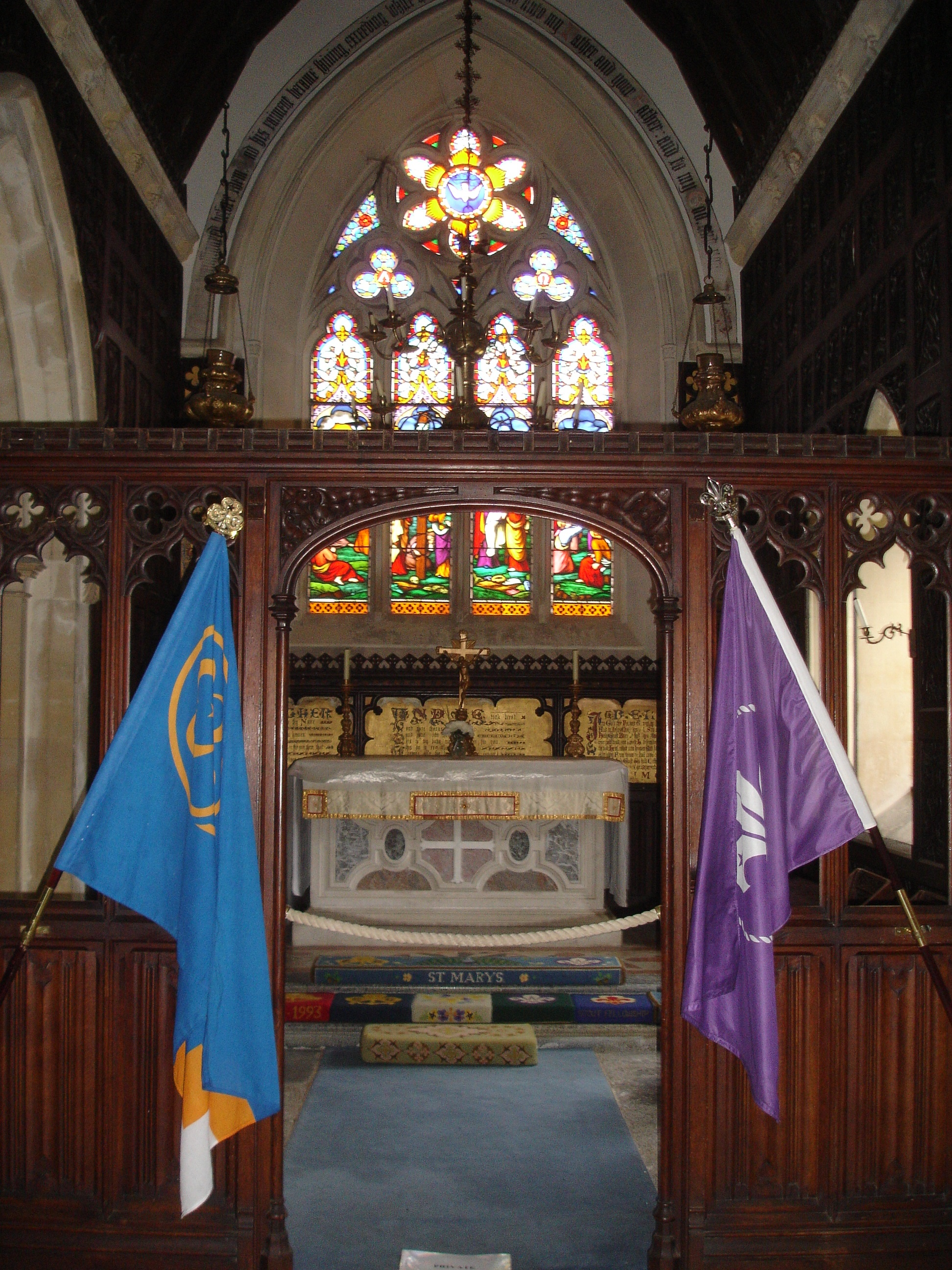
Scouting and Girl Guide flags in St. Mary's Church

The Baden-Powell Outdoor Centre was opened on 14 September 2007 and includes a new camp reception and new washroom facilities. The centre also hosts a small Scouting museum. The campsite is compartmentalised, with the memorial stone, shop, flags, and destination signs in one area on the south-west corner of the island. Radiating off from this centre are many small camp zones, about a dozen acres each, surrounded by trees and fences. The area set aside for camping now covers 50 acres (20 ha); there is room for up to four hundred campers on the site.

St. Mary's Church, located on the island about 0.2 miles (0.3 km) from the camp, posts Scout and Guide flags at the approach to the altar. In 2007, to coincide with the Scouting centenary, about 40 new kneelers or hassocks were given to the church, decorated with the 21 World Scout Jamboree badges and other Scouting, Guiding and island badges. The church is often used for services during large camps.

Brownsea Island is generally open to the public from March to October, via ferry from Poole. The island was reserved for Scouts and Scouters on 1 August 2007 during the Sunrise Camp. The National Trust operates events throughout the summer months including guided tours, trails, and activities in the visitor centre.

A statue of Baden-Powell, created in 2008 by sculptor David Annand to commemorate the camp, is situated in Poole and faces Brownsea Island.

== Centenary of Scouting ==
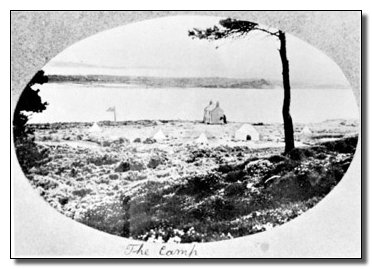
Postcard of first Scout encampment, Brownsea Island, August 1907

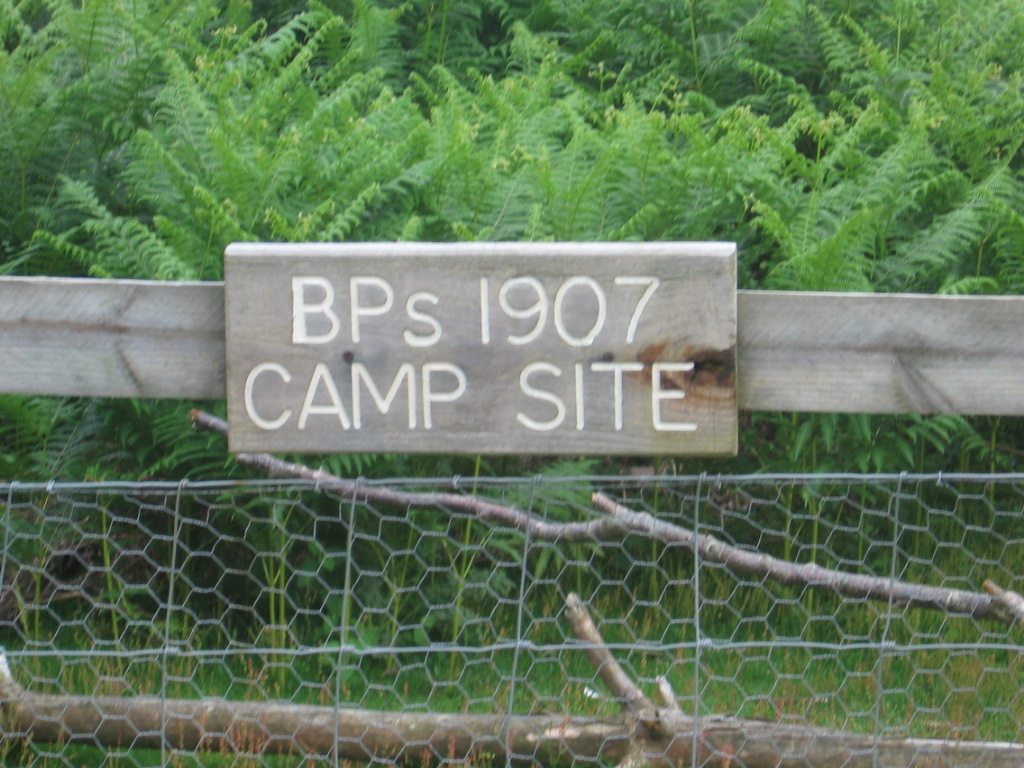
Sign that marks Baden-Powell's campsite

Since March 2006, travel packages have been available for Scouts to camp on the island, and Scout and Guide groups can also book day activities. To celebrate one hundred years of Scouting, four camps were organised on the island by The Scout Association during July and August 2007. The Patrol Leaders Camp, which ran from 26 until 28 July 2007, involved Scouts from the United Kingdom engaging in activities such as sea kayaking. The Replica Camp was a living history recreation of the original 1907 camp on Brownsea Island, which ran from 28 July to 3 August 2007, parallel to the other camps. The Sunrise Camp (29 July to 1 August 2007) hosted over 300 Scouts from nearly every country in the world. The young people travelled from the 21st World Scout Jamboree in Hylands Park, Essex, to Brownsea Island on 1 August 2007 for the Sunrise Ceremony. At 8:00 AM local time Scouts all over the world renewed their Scout promise. The Chief Scout of the United Kingdom, Peter Duncan, blew the original kudu horn. One Scout from each Scouting country passed over a "Bridge of Friendship"; Scouts shook the left hand of each Scout as they passed one another. The New Centenary Camp (1–4 August 2007) hosted Scouts from the United Kingdom and abroad.

== See also ==
- Scout Adventures – network of activity centres owned and managed by The Scout Association
- Lookwide Camp – the first official Scout camp, held in August 1908
