= George Errington =

George Errington may refer to:

- George Errington (martyr) (died 1596), English Roman Catholic martyr, beatified 1987
- George Errington (bishop) (1804–1884), Roman Catholic churchman, Bishop of Plymouth 1851–55, Coadjutor Archbishop of Westminster 1855–60
- Sir George Errington, 1st Baronet (1839–1920), Irish politician, MP for Longford 1874–85

== See also ==
- Errington (surname)
