= Lookwide Camp =

Site of the first scout camp in the United Kingdom

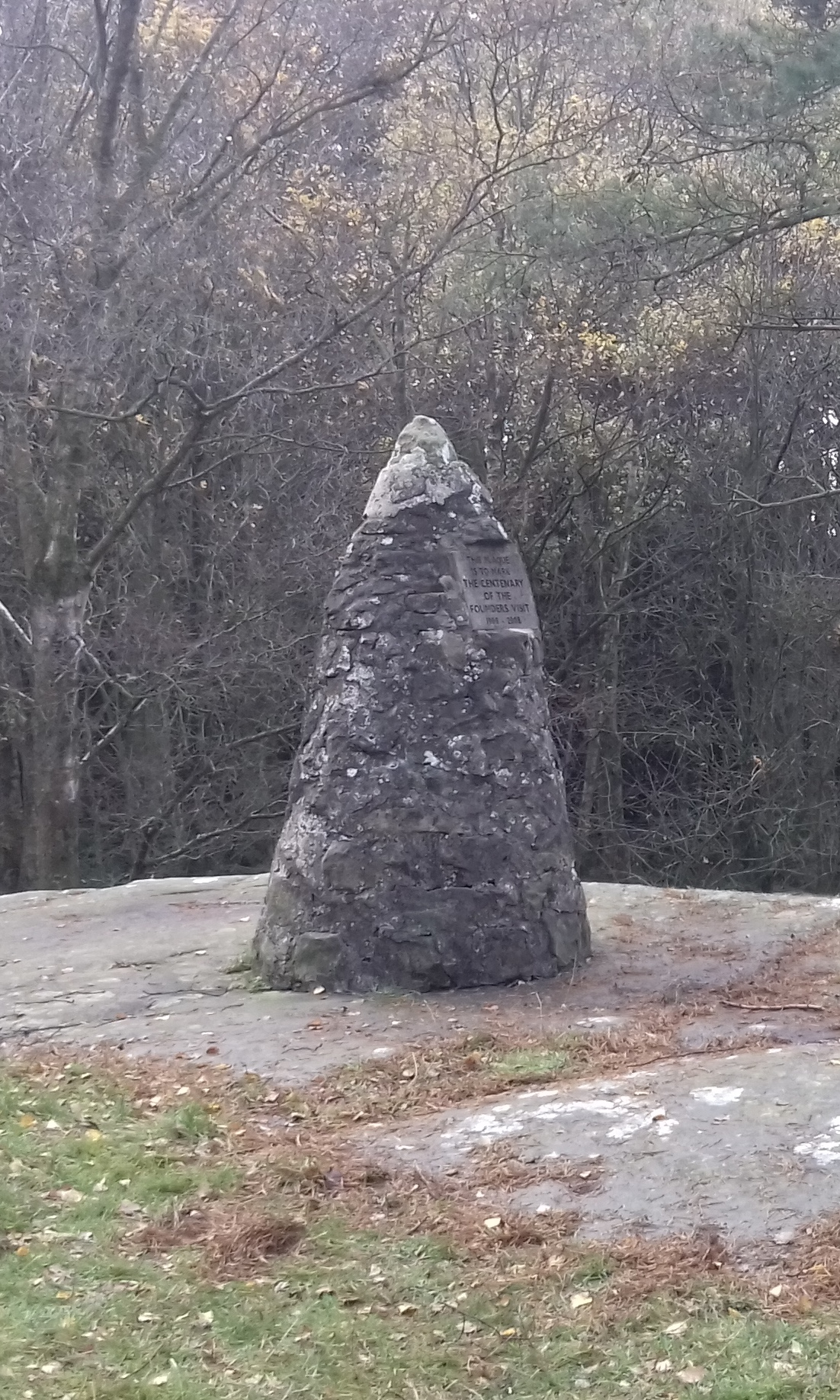
- Memorial cairn
- Location: Carr Edge, Humshaugh, Northumberland
- Country: United Kingdom
- Coordinates: 55.02178°N 2.181079°W
- Date: 22 August - 4 September 1908
- Attendance: 30

Lookwide Camp is recognised as the first official Scout camp. From 22 August to 4 September 1908, Baden-Powell ran a camp near Humshaugh, England. While Brownsea Island was the site of the experimental camp run by Baden-Powell in 1907, the Humshaugh camp had thirty Boy Scouts from around the United Kingdom who were members of recognised Scout Troops who followed the Scout Method and Scout Law as developed by Baden-Powell and published in his Scouting for Boys.

== Background ==
While the 1907 Brownsea encampment was first, it was an experimental camp and the boys involved were not yet "Scouts." The Humshaugh camp had thirty enrolled Boy Scouts from around the United Kingdom who were members of recognised Scout Troops who followed the Scout Method and Scout Law as developed by Baden-Powell and published in his Scouting for Boys.

The camp was advertised in the first issue of The Scout magazine in April 1908. The magazine asked the question "Who of you would want to spend a fortnight under canvas with a Troop of other boys, and under the care of General Baden-Powell?", which was met with great enthusiasm by the members of the fledgling movement. However, there was a catch – there were only thirty places available for Scouts on the camp, and they were to be selected by a voting system. Each issue of the magazine included a coupon which was to be sent back to the publisher with the name of a Scout being nominated to attend the camp.

This voting scheme was not the choice of Baden-Powell, but rather that of the magazine's publisher, C. Arthur Pearson, and many consider the idea to be a cynical marketing scheme designed to increase the sales of the magazine. Baden-Powell himself wrote "There is something in it which I fear will put off some readers of the better sort". However, this did not dampen the enthusiasm of the Scouts themselves. Lists were published in each issue, building up to the event, allowing Scouts to see who was in the top fifty nominees. When the voting had closed, the first placed Scout, F. D. Watson, had gained nominations from over 29,000 "friends".

Baden-Powell personally awarded the top fifty nominees a special edition "Scout" camera, along with a free copy of Scouting for Boys to the next fifty.

Look wide, beyond your immediate surroundings and limits, and you see things in their right proportion.

The name "Lookwide Camp" was given to the Carr Edge site near Humshaugh from one of the addresses given by Baden-Powell.

At the time the camp was announced, the location had not been selected. The site itself, "camping grounds at Walwick Grange, five miles from Hexham for a week, then tramps to neighbouring spots and bivouacs for the nights," was also selected by Baden-Powell.

== Participants ==
The thirty nominated participants became known as the "Gallant Thirty". They were divided into five Patrols, and joined by a further six Scouts who were invited by Baden-Powell himself, including his own nephew, Donald Baden-Powell (who was also a participant of the Brownsea Island camp).

A number of adults also participated in the camp, many of whom were to become key figures in the Scout Movement in the years following the camp:

- Percy Everett – was an editor in the employ of Pearson, and also attended the Brownsea Island camp
- Victor Bridges – became Secretary of the Scout Movement in its early years
- W. B. Wakefield – one of the first two Scout Inspectors, and donated the land which was to become Great Tower Scout Camp
- Eric Sherbrooke Walker – the other of the first Scout Inspectors
- Henry Holt – became the Quartermaster of the Scout Movement, and started what became the Scout Shop
- Captain Dennis Colbron Pearse was Assistant Commandant. Late he was instrumental in the formation of the local Scouting committees which were to become the District and County organisations. In 1922 he moved to Tasmania, Australia, and was involved in Scouting there.
- J. L. C. Booth

It is also believed that there were two instructors from the United States, but very few details are known about these participants.

== Programme ==
The camp participants visited many local sites of interest, including Haughton Castle, Hexham Abbey, and Walwick Grange. They also spent time exploring the nearby stretches of Hadrian's Wall.

However, much of the programme was based around the gully in which the camp was sited, and saw many of the Scout games and Scoutcraft activities which Baden-Powell and his fellow instructors had developed for the Movement.

== Centenary commemoration ==
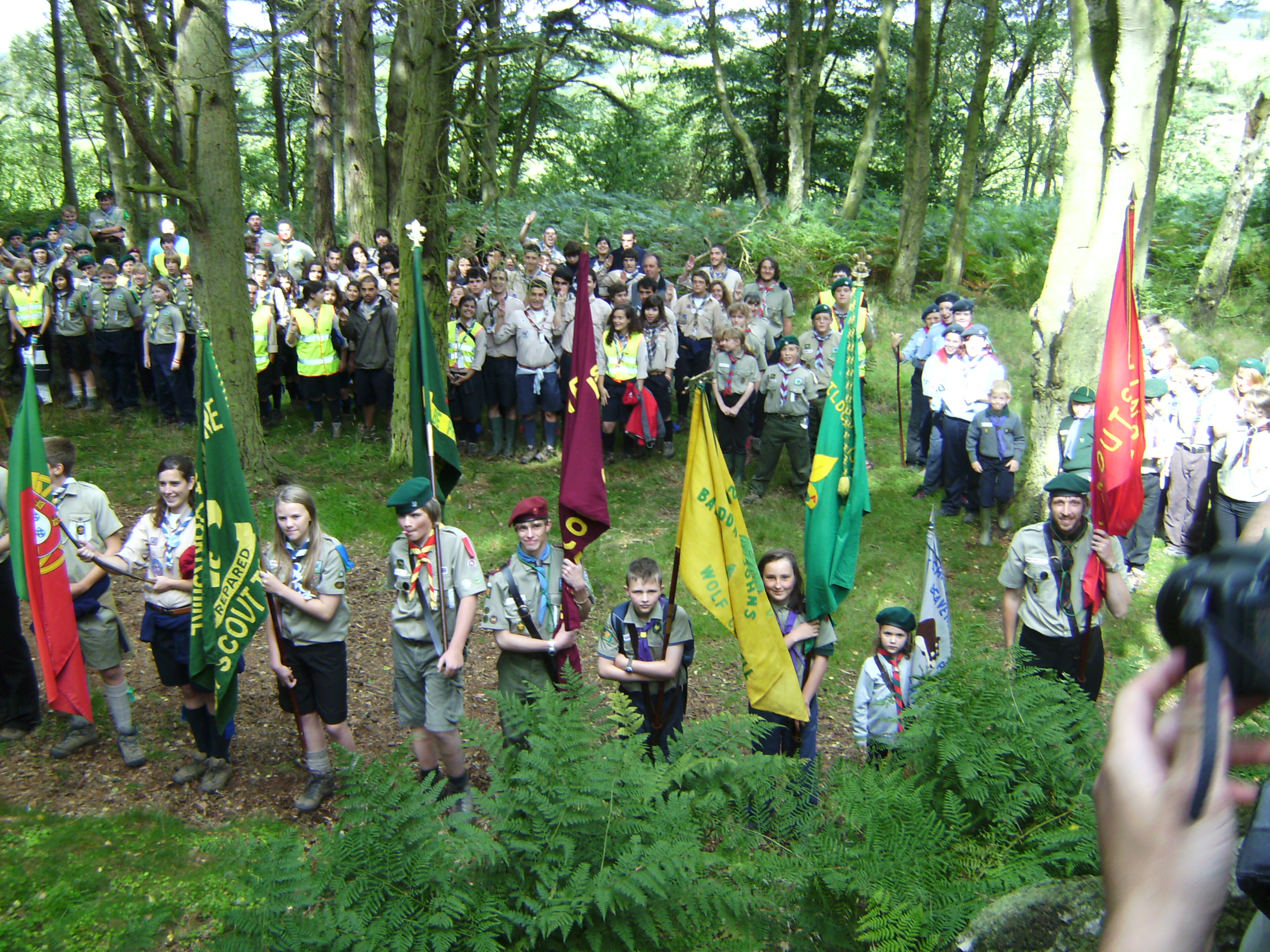
Jamboree 2008

In August 2008 Jamboree 2008 was held at a campsite close to Carr Edge, and was attended by groups from the Baden-Powell Scouts' Association, a Scout group from Portugal and members of The Scout Association. This event included the several features of the original camp, including a visit to Hexham Abbey and other local attractions.

On 22 August these Scouts retraced Baden-Powell's route from the former Fourstones railway station to the Carr Edge site, where a commemorative service was held (pictured).

Scouting's Sunrise

On 1 August 2007, Scouts from Ingleborough and Settle used the site to mark the centenary of the Scouting movement. They held a ceremony for Scouting's Sunrise.
