= Maryland, Brownsea Island =

Coordinates: 50.694°N 1.985°W

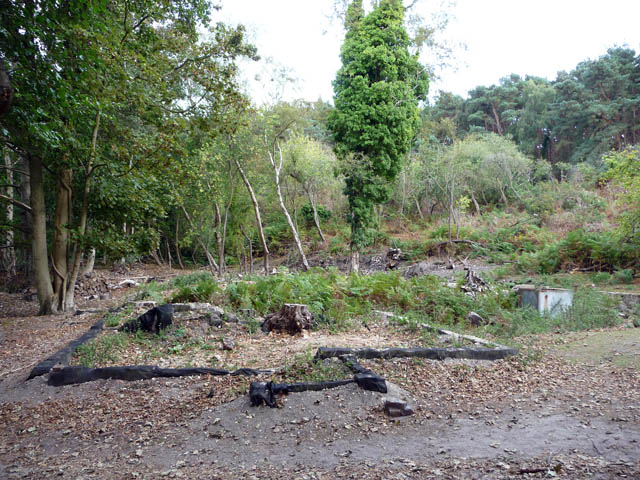
Remains of buildings at Maryland, Brownsea Island

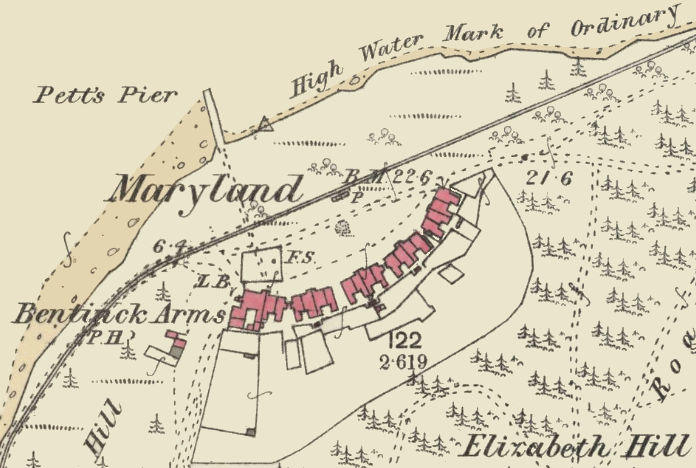
Maryland depicted on an Ordnance Survey map from 1889.

Maryland is a deserted village on Brownsea Island in Poole Harbour, Dorset, England. It was named for the wife of its founder, Colonel William Petrie Waugh.

The village was established in the mid-19th century to house workers for a new pottery industry (Branksea Clay & Pottery Company) on the island. The supposed deposit of high quality china clay proved to be unsuitable for porcelain, and the drainage pipes and chimney pots that were produced were not financially viable. The Waughs were forced into bankruptcy.

Maryland's people stayed on the island after the closure of the pottery, farming and working on the estate of the island's new owners; daffodil fields were a particular feature. In 1927, Mrs Mary Bonham-Christie bought the island and closed down much of its employment; the redundant workers moved to the mainland, and the village was finally abandoned in the same year.

During the Second World War II decoy lights were set nearby to divert German bombers from Poole and Bournemouth. The village was largely destroyed, and the ruins subsequently demolished.

== See also ==
- List of lost settlements in the United Kingdom
