= Brownsea Castle =

16th century fortification in Dorset, England

- Brownsea Island, Dorset, England
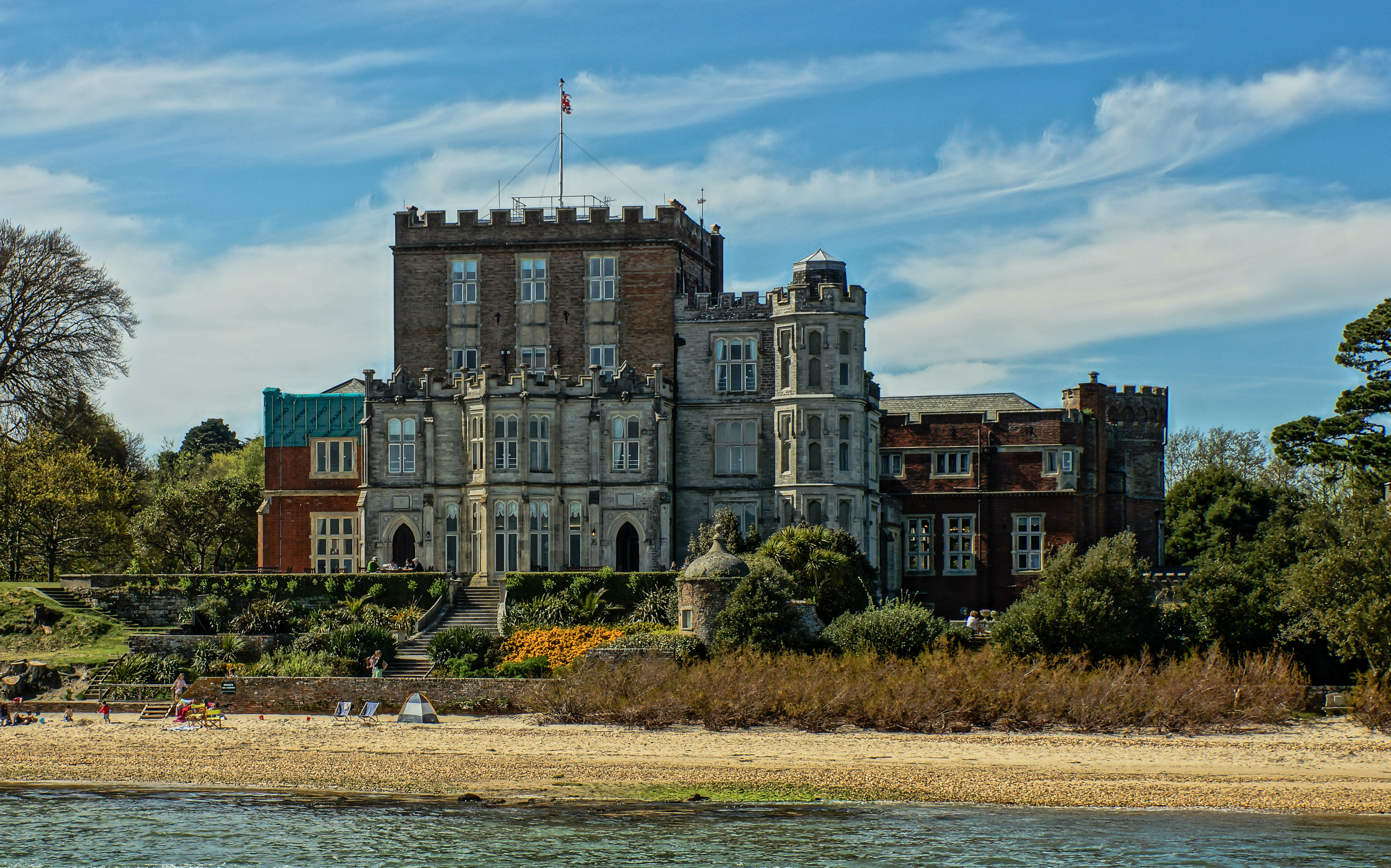
- Castle seen from the sea

Site information
- Type: Former Device Fort
- Owner: National Trust
- Controlled by: John Lewis Partnership

Listed Building – Grade II
- Official name: Brownsea Castle
- Designated: 13 December 1984
- Reference no.: 1120277
- Open to the public: No
- Condition: Restored after 1962

Location
- Coordinates: 50°41′18″N 1°57′30″W

Site history
- Built: 1545-47

Brownsea Castle, also known historically as Branksea Castle, was originally a Device Fort constructed by Henry VIII between 1545 and 1547 to protect Poole Harbour in Dorset, England, from the threat of French attack. Located on Brownsea Island, it comprised a stone blockhouse with a hexagonal gun platform. It was garrisoned by the local town with six soldiers and armed with eight artillery pieces. The castle remained in use after the original invasion scare had passed and was occupied by Parliament during the English Civil War of the 1640s. By the end of the century, however, it had fallen into disuse.

In 1726 the castle was converted into a private residence by William Benson, despite complaints from the town of Poole. Benson and the subsequent owners extended the original blockhouse to form a country house, landscaping the surrounding island to create ornamental gardens and lakes. The 19th century saw continued building work by the castle's occupants, including the entrepreneur Colonel William Waugh, who erected various Jacobethan-styled extensions. A serious fire in 1896 gutted the castle, which was restored by Major Kenneth Robert Balfour. The wealthy stockbroker Charles Van Raalte led a lavish lifestyle at Brownsea at the start of the 20th century, using it to house his collection of antique musical instruments.

Brownsea Castle was purchased by Mary Bonham-Christie in 1927. She allowed the property to fall into disrepair and by the time of her death in 1961 it was in a very poor condition. It was then purchased by the National Trust and leased to the John Lewis Partnership, who restored it over many years. In the 21st century it is still used by the Partnership as a corporate hotel for their employees and retired staff.

== History ==
=== 16th century ===
Brownsea Castle was built as a consequence of international tensions between England, France and the Holy Roman Empire in the final years of the reign of King Henry VIII. Traditionally the Crown had left coastal defences to the local lords and communities, only taking a small role in building and maintaining fortifications, and while France and the Empire remained in conflict with one another, maritime raids were common but an actual invasion of England seemed unlikely. Modest defences, based around simple blockhouses and towers, existed in the south-west and along the Sussex coast, with a few more impressive works in the north of England, but in general the fortifications were very limited in scale.

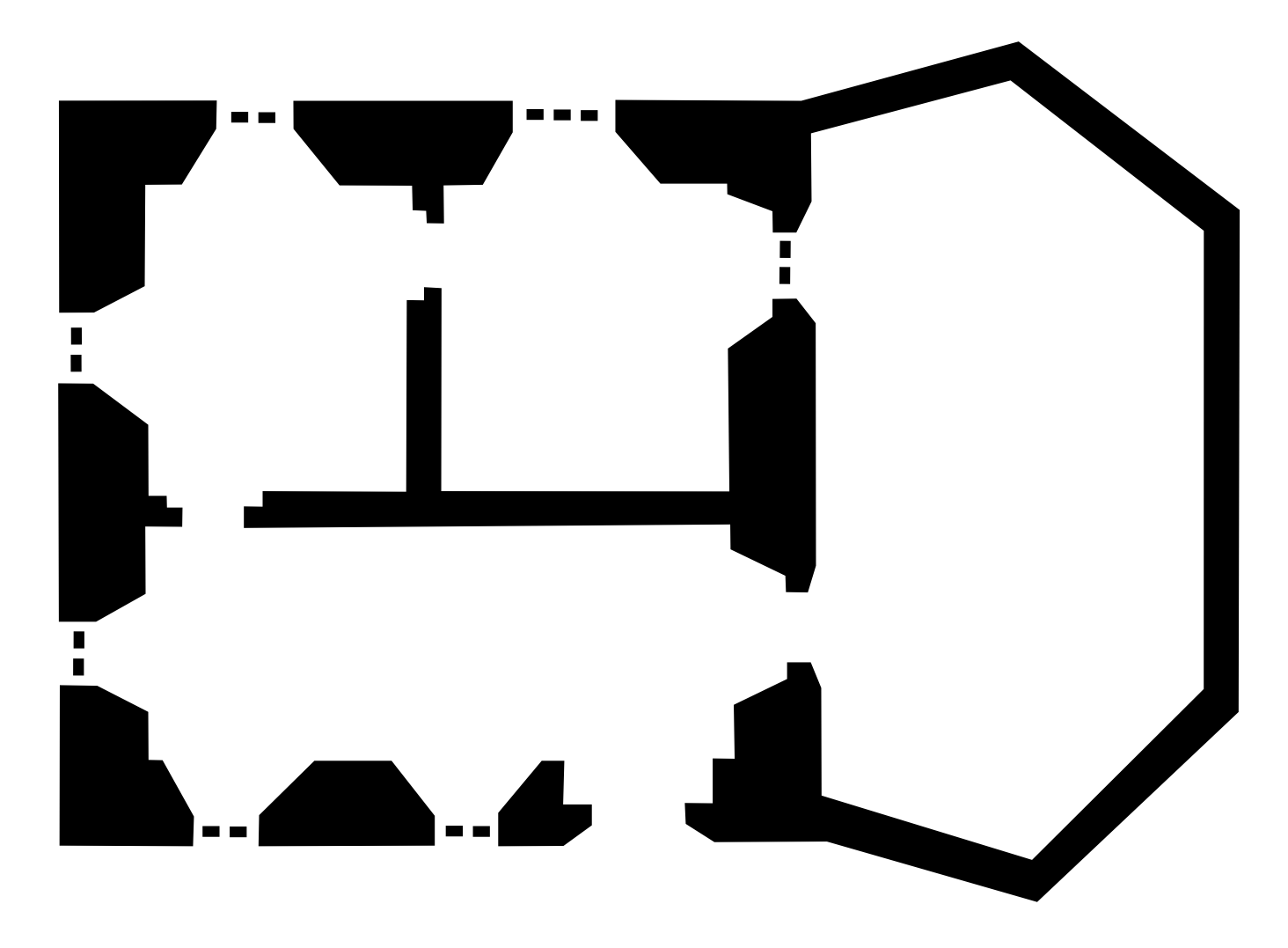
Plan of the 16th-century blockhouse

In 1533, Henry then broke with Pope Paul III in order to annul the long-standing marriage to his wife, Catherine of Aragon and remarry. This resulted in France and the Empire declaring an alliance against Henry in 1538, and the Pope encouraging the two countries to attack England. Henry responded in 1539 by ordering, through an instruction called a "device", the construction of fortifications along the most vulnerable parts of the coast. The immediate threat passed, but resurfaced in 1544, with France threatening an invasion across the Channel, backed by her allies in Scotland. Henry therefore issued another device in 1544 to further improve the country's defences, particularly along the south coast.

The castle was built on the south-east corner of Brownsea Island between 1545 and 1547 to protect the entrance of the busy Poole Harbour. The island belonged to the Crown, having been confiscated from Cerne Abbey during the Dissolution of the Monasteries a few years before. It was a conservative design, being a one-storey, square blockhouse, reported in 1552 to be 44 feet (13 m) across, able to support guns on its roof and sub-divided into three rooms; the blockhouse was originally intended to have been two storeys in height, but this was not achieved. The blockhouse was surrounded on the seaward side by a hexagonal gun platform, with a moat around the other three sides and a 24-foot-long (7.3 m) drawbridge on the south-west side to allow access.

The construction was paid for by a combination of the Crown and the local town of Poole, who took on the responsibility of garrisoning and maintaining it; in the early years of Elizabeth's reign, the normal garrison was described as comprising six men and was equipped with eight artillery pieces.

Additional work on the gun platform costing £56 was carried out in 1548, and further work was carried out in 1552 to develop the castle's defences, at the cost to Poole of £133. (Note: Comparing early modern costs and prices with those of the modern period is challenging. £56 in 1548 could be equivalent to between £27,000 and £12 million in 2014, depending on the price comparison used. £133 in 1552 could be equivalent to between £43,000 and £21 million, and £520 in 1571 between £158,000 and £62 million. For comparison, the total royal expenditure on all the Device Forts across England between 1539–47 came to £376,500, with St Mawes, for example, costing £5,018, and Sandgate £5,584.) The castle needed regular investment: 101 piles were driven in during 1551, probably to combat coastal erosion, and in 1561 the town petitioned the Crown for help with further repairs and the provision of new cannons. Another petition was made for similar help in 1571, resulting in repairs two years later costing £520 and requiring 4,000 tonnes (3,900 long tons; 4,400 short tons) of stone. More work followed in 1585, including building an additional 4-foot-high (1.2 m) wall around the castle.

In 1576, Elizabeth I granted the castles of Brownsea and Corfe for life to Sir Christopher Hatton, making him the Admiral of Purbeck. Hatton argued with the town of Poole, claiming that he had the right to search and inspect ships going into Poole Harbour, as well as the rights to the revenues from the local ferry service; he lost his legal case around the ferrying rights in 1581. In 1589, the Bountiful Gift refused to pull in for inspection, arguing that it had had a valid pass to leave, and Brownsea Castle fired on the vessel, killing two of the crew. The castle's captain, Walter Partridge, was tried and convicted of manslaughter, but ultimately pardoned. The rest of the island, but not the castle, was leased out to various landowners over the next few years.

=== 17th - 18th centuries ===
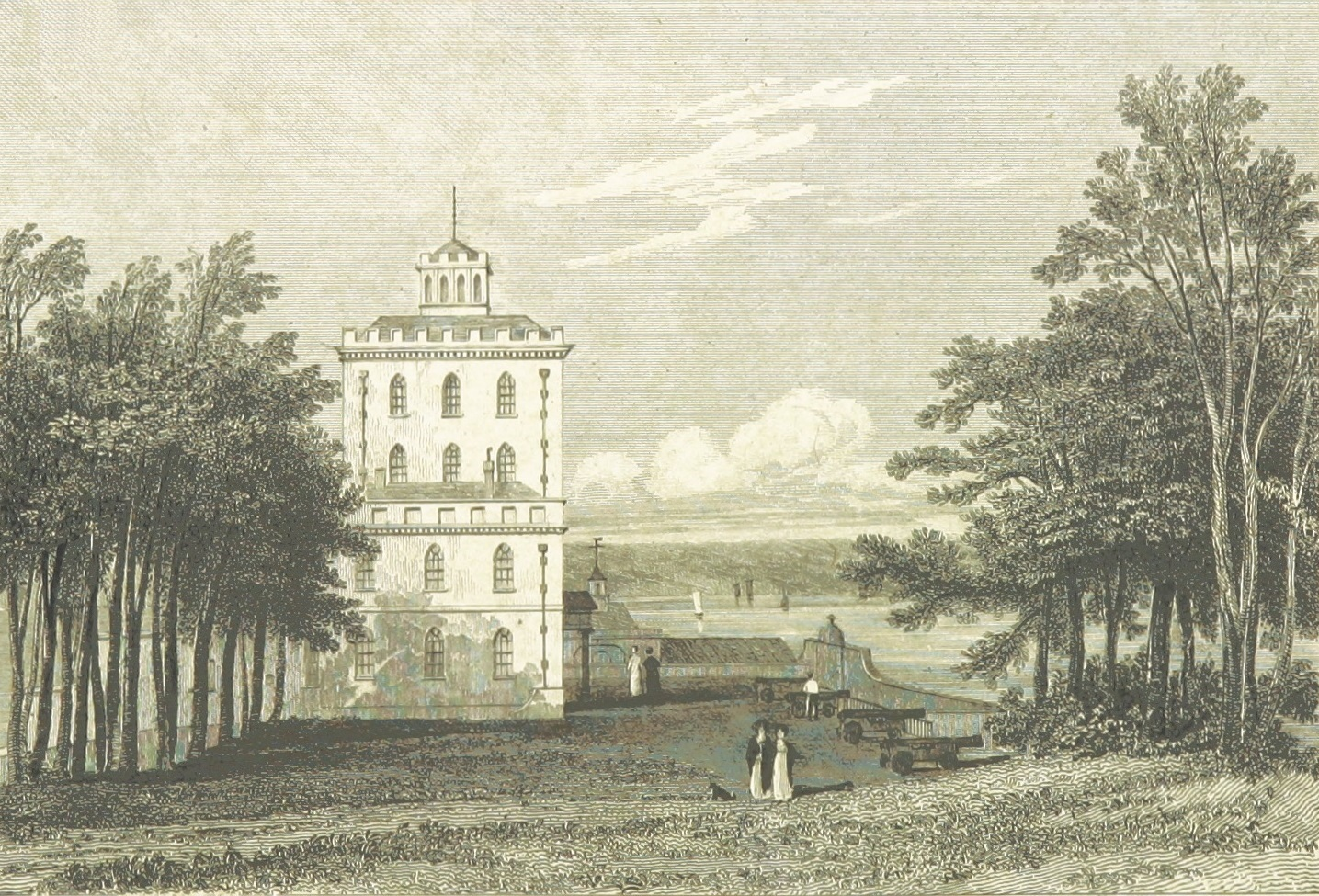
1818 view of the castle, showing the Palladian development of the original blockhouse by Sir Humphrey Sturt

The castle was garrisoned throughout most of the 17th century. In the civil war of the 1640s between the supporters of Charles I and Parliament, the castle was held for Parliament, under the control of the Governor of Poole. The castle was refortified and in 1644, Parliament ordered that four pieces of artillery and four chests of muskets be sent to the castle, which by 1646 had a garrison of 20 men. During the Interregnum, the wealthy merchant Sir Robert Clayton bought the surrounding island. Clayton probably did not live in the castle, however, and it fell into disrepair; by the end of the century the town of Poole refused to garrison the decaying defences.

The amateur architect William Benson bought the island from Clayton's heirs in 1726 for £300. (Note: Comparing early modern costs and prices with those of the modern period is challenging. £300 in 1726 could be worth between £40,000 and £5.4 million in 2014 terms, depending on the measure used. £50,000 in 1765 could be worth between £6.3 million and £657 million.) Benson set about converting the castle into a private residence, amid complaints from the authorities in Poole. The town took the matter to the Attorney General, where they argued that Benson had not bought the rights to the castle itself, only the island, and that the castle was a national fortification, originally built by Henry VIII and owned by Poole. Benson argued that the building had not originally been a castle but rather a lodging house; it had not been built by Henry and therefore the Crown had no particular rights over it - rather, the previous owners of the island had simply allowed the town and the government to place artillery there. The matter was eventually dropped and Benson demolished the external fortifications, created a Great Hall and planted trees and rare plants around the island.

The castle was sold to a Mr Chamberlayne and then onto Sir Gerard Sturt in 1762 and Gerard's cousin, Sir Humphrey Sturt, in 1765. Humphrey extended the castle around its 16th century core to form a Palladian styled, four-storey tower with battlements, with new wings stretching away on three sides. He also built a walled courtyard with hot houses beside the castle, and landscaped the island with two lakes and a large number of fir trees at a cost of £50,000. His son, Charles Sturt, made the castle his primary home, although he was often living elsewhere as a result of his involvement in the Napoleonic Wars.

=== 19th century ===
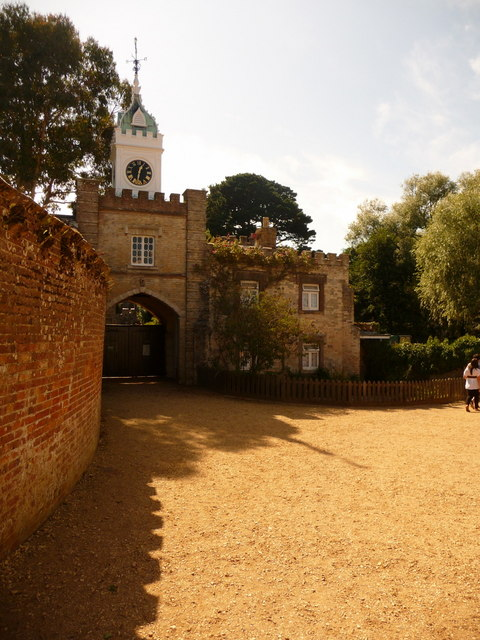
The gatehouse and clocktower, built in 1852

Charles Sturt's son, also called Charles, inherited the property and sold it to Sir Charles Chad in 1817. Chad invested significantly in the castle and Prince George visited in 1818, arriving to a salute from the castle guns. The diplomat Sir Augustus Foster acquired the castle in 1840 on his retirement; he committed suicide at the castle in 1848, having been in what his inquest termed a state of temporary insanity following a "disease of the heart and lungs".

A retired Indian Army officer, Colonel William Waugh, bought the island in 1852, hoping to turn it into a profitable pottery works. He carried out restoration work on the castle and built up a new Jacobethan-styled range around the south and east sides of the castle. Waugh also constructed the crenelated gatehouse and clocktower at the entrance to the courtyard, and the Jacobethan-styled family pier by the sea below the castle. The commercial venture was a failure and Waugh fled his creditors to Spain in 1857.

After a period of ownership by a Mr Faulkner, who continued the pottery scheme, the property was eventually resold in 1873 to the politician and lawyer George Cavendish-Bentinck for £30,000, who furnished the castle with an extensive collection of Italian Renaissance sculpture. (Note: £30,000 in 1873 could be worth between £2.6 million and £42 million in 2014 terms, depending on the measure used. £125,000 in 1927 could be worth between £6.7 million and £50 million in 2014 terms, depending on the measure used, £22,000 between £1.2 million and £8.9 million.) Cavendish-Bentinck closed the pottery works and gave the island as a family home to his son, William, paying for the castle to be extensively renovated; William and his wife Ruth moved into it in 1888. Cavendish-Bentinck died in 1891 with extensive debts, forcing William to sell the castle and island to Major Kenneth Robert Balfour.

After the installation of new-fangled electric lighting, the castle caught fire on 26 January 1896 and the interiors were gutted by the blaze. Balfour rebuilt the property with the services of the architect Philip Brown, softening the more complex aspects of the castle's design. Balfour's wife, Margaret Anne, fell ill and he decided to sell the island in 1901 to the stockbroker Charles van Raalte.

=== 20th century ===
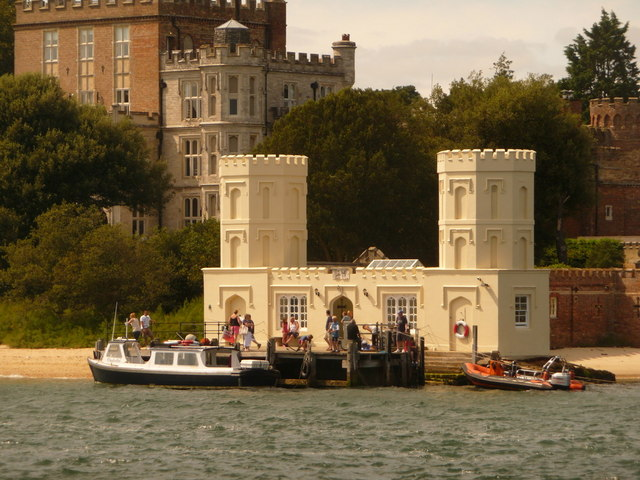
The Family Pier, also dating from 1852

In 1901 the island was bought by the stockbroker Charles van Raalte, who maintained a lavish lifestyle at the castle, which by now had 38 bedrooms. The van Raaltes held grand house-parties during the summer months, complete with servants and a part-time musical band. They assembled a rare collection of around 250 historical musical instruments from Europe, Asia and Africa at the castle.

Charles van Raalte died in 1908 but his wife Florence stayed until 1925. On Florence's death in 1927 the castle was sold to Sir Arthur Wheeler, who promptly decided to auction off the remaining contents with the intent of demolishing the property. The sale, which included some of Van Raalte's collection of instruments, paintings and a 5,000 book library, produced £22,300.

The castle was not demolished as planned and instead was purchased by Mary Bonham-Christie for £125,000 later that year. She decided to live in a nearby house rather than in the castle itself, allowing the island to return to nature and the castle to fall into disrepair.

1932 was the Silver Jubilee of that first Camp, and Mrs Bonham Christie permitted celebrations to be held on the Island, and 500 Scouts camped on the original site. Two years later, in 1934, a bush-fire broke out, raged for three days and caused enormous damage.

By the time of Bonham-Christie's death in 1961 the roof of the castle had partially collapsed and a tree was growing up through the centre of the building. Facing large death duties, Bonham-Christie's grandson proposed to build 400 luxury houses on the island, but this caused such an outcry that the proposal was refused. HM Treasury agreed to accept it in lieu of death duty. However, HM Treasury deals only in money, so offered the Island to the National Trust for £100,000. The National Trust could only raise £25,000, so the remaining £75,000 was raised equally by the Boy Scout & Girl Guide Movements, by the forerunner of the Dorset WildLife Trust, who took over management of the North half the island, and by the John Lewis Partnership, who bought a 99-year repairing lease of the Castle and gardens for use as a corporate hotel by their employees, they gradually restored the buildings in stages and they remain the current tenants.

The National Trust took ownership of the castle and island in 1962 but considered the castle to be of "little antiquity or architectural interest". Some of the 19th century interior features still survive, including wood panelling and ornamental ceilings, with some carved stone fireplaces from Venice; the castle also has four cannons, probably dating from the 17th or early 18th century. The castle is protected under UK law as a Grade II listed building.

== Bibliography ==
- Anonymous (1927). "A Musician's Paradise". The Musical Times. 68 (1008): 162.
- Biddle, Martin; Hiller, Jonathon; Scott, Ian; Streeten, Anthony (2001). Henry VIII's Coastal Artillery Fort at Camber Castle, Rye, East Sussex: An Archaeological Structural and Historical Investigation. Oxford, UK: Oxbow Books. ISBN 0904220230.
- Garnett, Oliver (2005) [1993]. Brownsea Castle (corrected ed.). Swindon, UK: The National Trust. ISBN 978-1-84359-110-8.
- Graubard, Margaret E. M. (2008). In the Best Society. Bloomington, US: iUniverse. ISBN 9780595498314.
- Hale, John R. (1983). Renaissance War Studies. London, UK: Hambledon Press. ISBN 0907628176.
- Harrington, Peter (2007). The Castles of Henry VIII. Oxford, UK: Osprey Publishing. ISBN 9781472803801.
- King, D. J. Cathcart (1991). The Castle in England and Wales: An Interpretative History. London, UK: Routledge Press. ISBN 9780415003506.
- Legg, Rodney (1986). Brownsea: Dorset's Fantasy Island. Sherborne, UK: The Dorset Publishing Company. ISBN 0902129740.
- Morley, B. M. (1976). Henry VIII and the Development of Coastal Defence. London, UK: Her Majesty's Stationery Office. ISBN 0116707771.
- Sydenham, John (1839). History of the Town and Country of Poole. Poole, UK: Sydenham. OCLC 5842224.
- Saunders, Andrew (1989). Fortress Britain: Artillery Fortifications in the British Isles and Ireland. Liphook, UK: Beaufort. ISBN 1855120003.
- Thompson, M. W. (1987). The Decline of the Castle. Cambridge, UK: Cambridge University Press. ISBN 1854226088.
- Urban, Sylvanus (1848). The Gentleman's Magazine. Vol. 30. London, UK: John Boyers Nichols and Son. OCLC 1570611.
- Van der Straeten, E. (1927). "Sale of the van Raalte Collection of Old Instruments". The Musical Times. 68 (1014): 712.
- Van Raalte, Charles (1905). "Brownsea Island". Proceedings of the Dorset Natural History and Archaeological Society. 26: 187–194.
