= Henry Abbot (martyr) =

English Roman Catholic layman and martyr

Blessed Henry Abbot

Martyr
- Born: Howden, East Riding of Yorkshire, Kingdom of England
- Died: 4 July 1597; York, Yorkshire, Kingdom of England
- Venerated in: Roman Catholic Church (Great Britain)
- Beatified: 15 December 1929, Vatican City, by Pope Pius XI
- Feast: 4 July

Henry Abbot (died 4 July 1597) was an English layman, himself a convert from the Church of England, who was executed at York for the alleged attempt to convert someone to the Catholic Church, which had been declared an act of treason under the Penal Laws enacted under Queen Elizabeth I. He is considered a martyr for the faith by the Catholic Church, which has beatified him.

== Biography ==
Henry Abbot was from Howden in the East Riding of Yorkshire.

His acts are thus related by Challoner:

A certain Protestant minister, for some misdemeanour put into York Castle, to reinstate himself in the favour of his superiors, insinuated himself into the good opinion of the Catholic prisoners, by pretending a deep sense of repentance, and a great desire of embracing the Catholic truth . . . So they directed him, after he was enlarged, to Mr. Henry Abbot, a zealous convert who lived in Holden in the same country, to procure a priest to reconcile him . . . Mr. Abbot carried him to Carlton to the house of Esquire Stapleton, but did not succeed in finding a priest. Soon after, the traitor having got enough to put them all in danger of the law, accused them to the magistrates . . . They confessed that they had explained to him the Catholic Faith, and upon this they were all found guilty and sentenced to die.

George Errington, William Knight and William Gibson] were executed on 29 November 1596. Abbot was reprieved till the next July, when he was executed alongside William Andleby, Thomas Warcop, and Edward Fulthrop.

The first three were beatified on 22 November 1987 by Pope John Paul II. Abbot was declared Venerable on 8 December 1929, and was beatified on 15 December 1929 by Pope Pius XI as part of a group of 137 citizens of England and Wales who met that same fate.
