= Helen Brotherton =

English conservationist (1914–2009)

Helen Brotherton (fair use pic) taken from a photo with David Attenborough in 1985

Helen Alice Jane Brotherton, CBE BEM (9 February 1914 – 6 August 2009) was an English conservationist. She was founder of the Dorset Wildlife Trust.

== Early life and education ==
Helen Brotherton was born at Harscott in Lincolnshire, and raised at Leamington Spa, the daughter of Eric and Helen Jakeman Brotherton. She trained as a teacher at Roehampton.

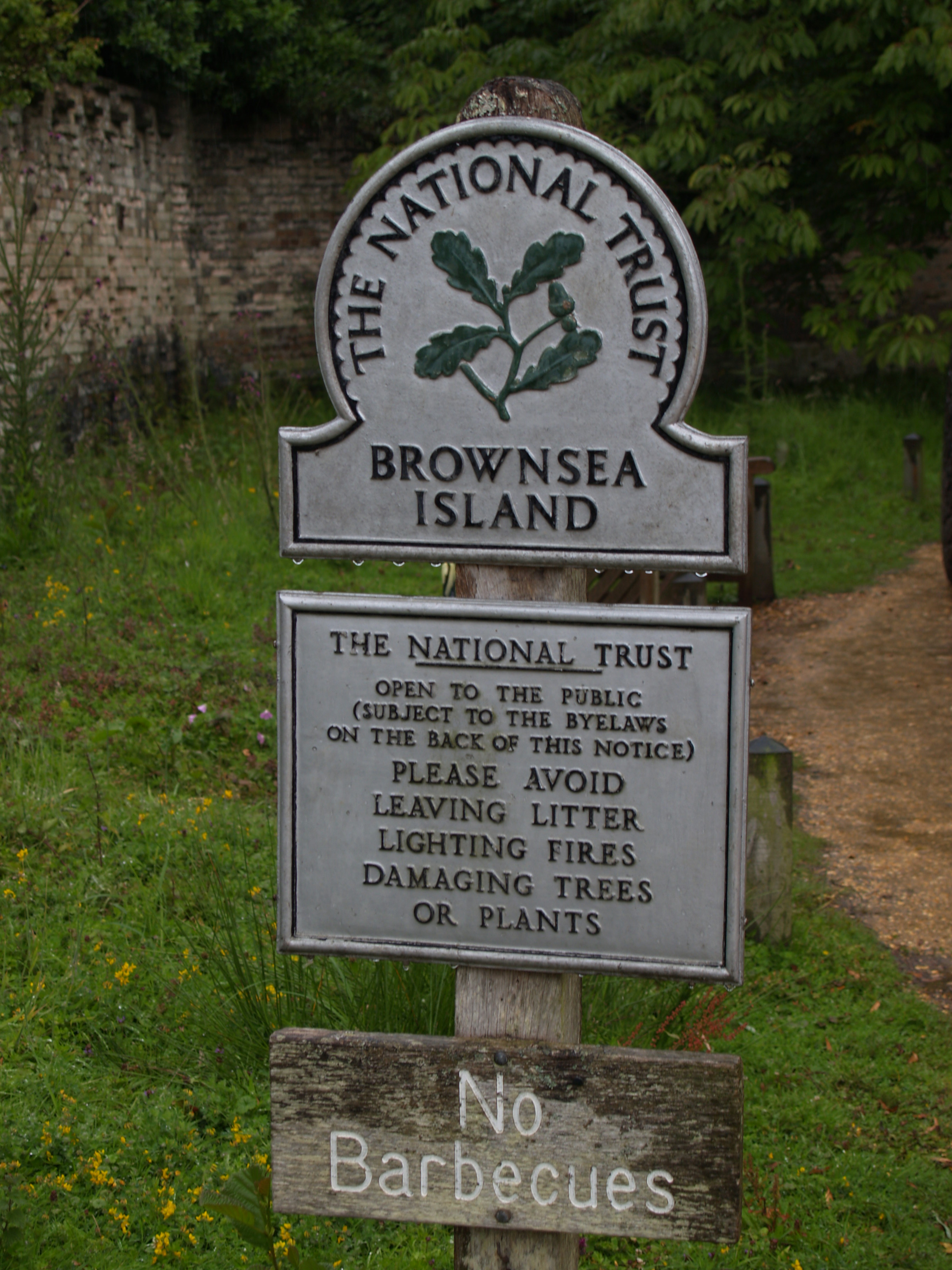
Brownsea Island Sign

== Career ==
Her first teaching job was at Norwich High School for Girls. During World War II, she joined the Women's Voluntary Service, and eventually ran the Sick Bays in Warwickshire, for which she received the British Empire Medal in 1943. She moved to Poole, Dorset, after the war, to care for her aging mother. An avid birdwatcher, she volunteered with the Dorset Field Ornithology Group, and through that group learned of the specific environmental issues in Dorset. She sailed her own boat to Brownsea Island for explorations, against the ban on public access, issued and enforced by the island's reclusive owner, Mary Bonham-Christie. In the early 1960s, after Bonham-Christie's death, Brotherton organized a group to oppose development on Brownsea Island, because the planned development would threaten a wading birds habitat. Because of her group's efforts, the National Trust took ownership of Brownsea, and the group developed into the Dorset Wildlife Trust. Helen Brotherton was the Trust's first and longtime secretary. In 1963, she was appointed an OBE for her environmental work.

Brotherton worked with the coastal protection project "Operation Neptune" as the National Trust's regional representative in Wessex. In 1984, she was appointed a CBE for this activism. She founded the Portland Bird Observatory, was a trustee of the Chesil and Fleet Trust. In 1992, she received the Christopher Cadbury medal from the Royal Society of Wildlife Trusts, and in 2007 she won the Octavia Hill medal for her lifetime achievements in environmental conservation.

== Personal life and legacy ==
As a side interest, Helen Brotherton contributed funds to the Salisbury Diocesan Guild of Ringers, to purchase bells in memory of her brother, Roderic Brotherton, who died in World War II.

Helen Brotherton died in 2009, aged 95 years, at Poole Hospital. At the time of her death, the Dorset Wildlife Trust had over 25,000 members.

The Dorset Wildlife Trust presents a Helen Brotherton Award for Volunteering, begun in 2008 and named in her honor. In 2013, the Bishop of Salisbury dedicated a memorial to Helen Brotherton, in St. Mary's Church on Brownsea Island.
