= William Knight (martyr) =

English layman and martyr

- Born: 1572, South Duffield, East Riding of Yorkshire, England
- Died: 29 November 1596, York, England
- Martyred by: Queen Elizabeth I of England
- Means of martyrdom: Hanging, drawing and quartering
- Venerated in: Great Britain
- Beatified: 22 November 1987, London, England, by Pope John Paul II
- Feast: 4 May

William Knight (1572 – 29 November 1596) was an English layman put to death for his Catholic faith at York, England. With him also suffered George Errington of Herst, Northumberland; William Gibson of Ripon; and Henry Abbot of Howden, Yorkshire.

== Life ==
Knight, apparently a secret convert to the Catholic Church, was the son of a Leonard Knight and lived at South Duffield, a hamlet currently in North Yorkshire but part of the East Riding of Yorkshire at the time. On coming of age, he claimed from his uncle some property which had been left to him by his father, an Anglican, and his uncle denounced him to the authorities for being a Roman Catholic. He was at once seized and committed to the custody of Roger Colyer, a pursuivant, who treated him with indignity and severity.

He was sent in October 1593, to York Castle, where William Gibson and George Errington were already confined, the latter having been arrested some years before for participation in a rising in the North.

A Church of England clergyman was among the prisoners at York. To gain his freedom, he had recourse to an act of treachery: feigning a desire to convert to the Roman Church, he won the confidence of Knight and his two companions, who explained their faith to him. With the connivance of the authorities, he was directed to Henry Abbot, then at liberty, who endeavoured to procure a priest to reconcile him to the Church. When the minister had sufficient evidence, Abbot was arrested and, together with Knight and his two comrades, accused of attempting to persuade the clergyman to embrace Roman Catholicism — an act of treason under the penal laws. The men were found guilty, and, with the exception of Abbot who was executed later, suffered hanging, drawing and quartering at York on 29 November 1596. Knight was about 24 years old when he died.

Knight was one of the eighty-five martyrs of England and Wales beatified by Pope John Paul II on 22 November 1987 during a trip to Great Britain.
