= Donald Ferlys Wilson Baden-Powell =

British geologist (1897–1973)

Donald Ferlys Wilson Baden-Powell (5 October 1897 – 11 September 1973), son of Sir George Smyth Baden-Powell, was a geologist who taught geology and palaeolithic archaeology at the University of Oxford.

When Donald's father, Sir George Baden-Powell, died in 1898, his uncle, R.S.S. Baden-Powell, became something of a father figure. Donald (then aged 9, so too young to be included in a Patrol) attended the first experimental scout camp at Brownsea Island in August 1907 as well as the scout camp at Humshaugh in 1908.

== Background ==
In 1912, then aged 14, Donald was taken (paid for by his mother) by B-P, his uncle, on a combined vacation and fishing trip to Germany and Norway. They visited Hamburg zoo, where a Zeppelin flew overhead. They took a train which then was carried over from Sassnitz in Germany to Trollborg [sic - now Trelleborg] in Sweden on the ferry, and thence to Christiania (now Oslo) by 9pm on 29 Aug, 1912. ""Put up at the Grand Hotel (in mistake for the one I wanted, the Victoria)." They visited two 1100-year-old Viking ships, then took the afternoon train to Atna. They crossed the Glommer [sic - Glomma] river near Atna by ferry - there is now a single-lane bridge - and spent the night in a 300-year-old saeter (log cabin) at Atneosen on the West bank. "Drove in a pony cart - walking a bit of the way and eating wild raspberries - via Sollien [sic - Sollia] to Uti [sic - Utti, on the north bank of the Atna river at Atnbrua] 49 kilometres."

They stayed at the little farm named Finstad, 6 km East of Atnbrua, for 6 days,1–6 September 1912, exploring and fishing in the river Atna. By 10 Dec they were back at Christiania (Oslo) where they watched Autumn manoeuvres of the Reservists and Volunteers, and sailed back to Britain on the "Eskimo", passing a fleet of Hull trawlers on the Dogger Bank. The total cost of the trip was £51 6s 4d. Expenses in Norway were £23 9s 4d = 427 Kroner at that time.

Donald was educated first at Cheltenham College (his mother, Frances Wilson, was from Cheltenham), then at Eton College. Upon leaving school, Donald joined up, and was commissioned as Sub-Lt in the RNAS in Jan. 1916; he then transferred to become 2nd Lt in the Rifle Brigade 1917–18, and was wounded in Dec 1917.

In 1917 Donald went up to Oriel College, University of Oxford, whence he graduated as BA in 1922, later attaining a Masters of Arts (1925) and Bachelor of Science (1926) at the same university.

He became a member of the Mercer's Company by patrimony in 1925.

He married Muriel Jane Thomson Duncan (d.1967) on 25 October 1924. Donald and Jane had two sons, David Duncan Baden-Powell (1926–1939) and Francis Robert Baden-Powell (b. 16 September 1929 - 2004). In 1975 Francis established the Donald Baden-Powell Quaternary Research Centre in Oxford.

== Bibliography ==
- Experimental Clactonian Technique 1949
- Palaeoliths from the Fen District 1950
- The Age of Interglacial Deposits at Swanscombe 1951
- Report on the Re-investigation of the Westley (Bury St Edmunds) Skull Site 1952
- Summer Field Meeting in East Anglia. Report 1960
- A Specimen of a Lava Millstone from Snowford, Warwickshire 1962
