= Errington =

Errington may refer to:

- Errington, British Columbia, a small community on Vancouver Island, British Columbia, Canada
- Errington Elementary School, a public elementary school in Errington, British Columbia, Canada
- John T. Errington Elementary School, a public elementary school in Richmond, British Columbia, Canada
- Errington (surname), list of people with this name
- The Errington baronets, three Baronetcies of England and the United Kingdom
- Errington v Wood, a 1951 English contract law case concerning agreement
