= William Errington =

William Errington (1699 – 5 Mar 1739) was High Sheriff of Northumberland.

Errington was the only son of Francis Errington (1665–1699), a Catholic of the landed gentry branch of Walwick Grange, Northumberland. He married Mrs Isabel Bacon at Haydon Bridge on 17 Oct 1731 and was appointed High Sheriff of Northumberland in 1739 not long before his death.

He left one son John (1733–1768), gentleman of High Warden, Northumberland and direct maternal ancestor of Sir William Errington Hume (1879–1960) physician and his son Cardinal George Basil Hume (1923–1999), Catholic Archbishop of Westminster.
