= Anthony Errington =

Anthony Errington, D.D. (died 1719), was an English Catholic divine.

Errington was a member of a Northumbrian family. His name appears on a list of writers at the English College, Douai, but he was more probably educated at Lisbon and Paris. He is said to have died about 1719.

He wrote:

- Catechistical Discourses,’ Paris, 1654, 16mo, dedicated to the ‘Princesse Henrietta Maria, daughter of England’.
- Missionarium: sive opusculum practicum, pro fide propaganda et conservanda, Rome, 1672, 12mo.
