= Shelly Errington =

American photographer

- Born: August 14, 1944 (age 82); New Orleans, Louisiana, U.S.
- Education: Tulane University; Cornell University
- Scientific career
- Fields: Cultural anthropology
- Workplaces: Harvard University; Smithsonian Institution

Shelly E. Errington is a cultural anthropologist specializing in the studies of plastic art and narrative arts, focusing on documentary film, photography, arts, and multi-media. She is a professor emerita of Anthropology at the University of California, Santa Cruz.

== Life ==
Errington received a B.A. in 1966 from Newcomb College in New Orleans, Louisiana and an M.A and Ph.D. at Cornell University. In 1981, she was the recipient of one of the first MacArthur Foundation "genius grants".

Errington has done field work in Papua New Guinea, Indonesia and Mexico. Her current courses include a study of Multi-Media Ethnography. She is currently working on a documentary film on the art of the Pátzcuaro region of Mexico, and an accompanying book on the subject.

On September 24, 2009, she spoke at a rally protesting cuts to California University education.

== Selected bibliography ==
- The Death of Authentic Primitive Art and Other Tales of Progress. Berkeley: University of California Press, 1998.
- Power and Difference: Gender in Island Southeast Asia (edited with J. Atkinson). Stanford, Calif.: Stanford University Press, 1990.
- Meaning and Power in a Southeast Asian Realm. Princeton, N.J.: Princeton University Press, 1989.
- "The Cosmic Theme Park of the Javanese" Review of Indonesian and Malaysian Arts, published in Sydney, Australia, July 1997.
- "Myth and Structure in Disney World." In Meaning in the Visual Arts: Views From the Outside. Edited by Irving Lavin. Princeton: Princeton University Press, 1995.
- "What Became Primitive art?" Cultural Anthropology 9 (2) : 201–226, 1994.
- "Making Progress on Borobudur: A New Perspective." Visual Anthropology Review 9 (2): 32–59, Fall 1993.
- "Progressivist Stories and the Pre-Columbian Past: Notes on Mexico and the United States." In Collecting the Pre-Columbian Past, pp. 209–49. Edited by Elizabeth Boone. Washington D.C.: Dumbarton Oaks, 1993.
- "Some Comments on Style in the Meaning of the Past," Journal of Asian Studies, 38:2, 231–244, 1979.
- "The Cosmic House of the Buginese," Asia, 1:5, 8–14, 1979.
