= Brownsea Island =

Island in Poole Harbour, Dorset, England

Coordinates: 50°41′30″N 01°58′20″W

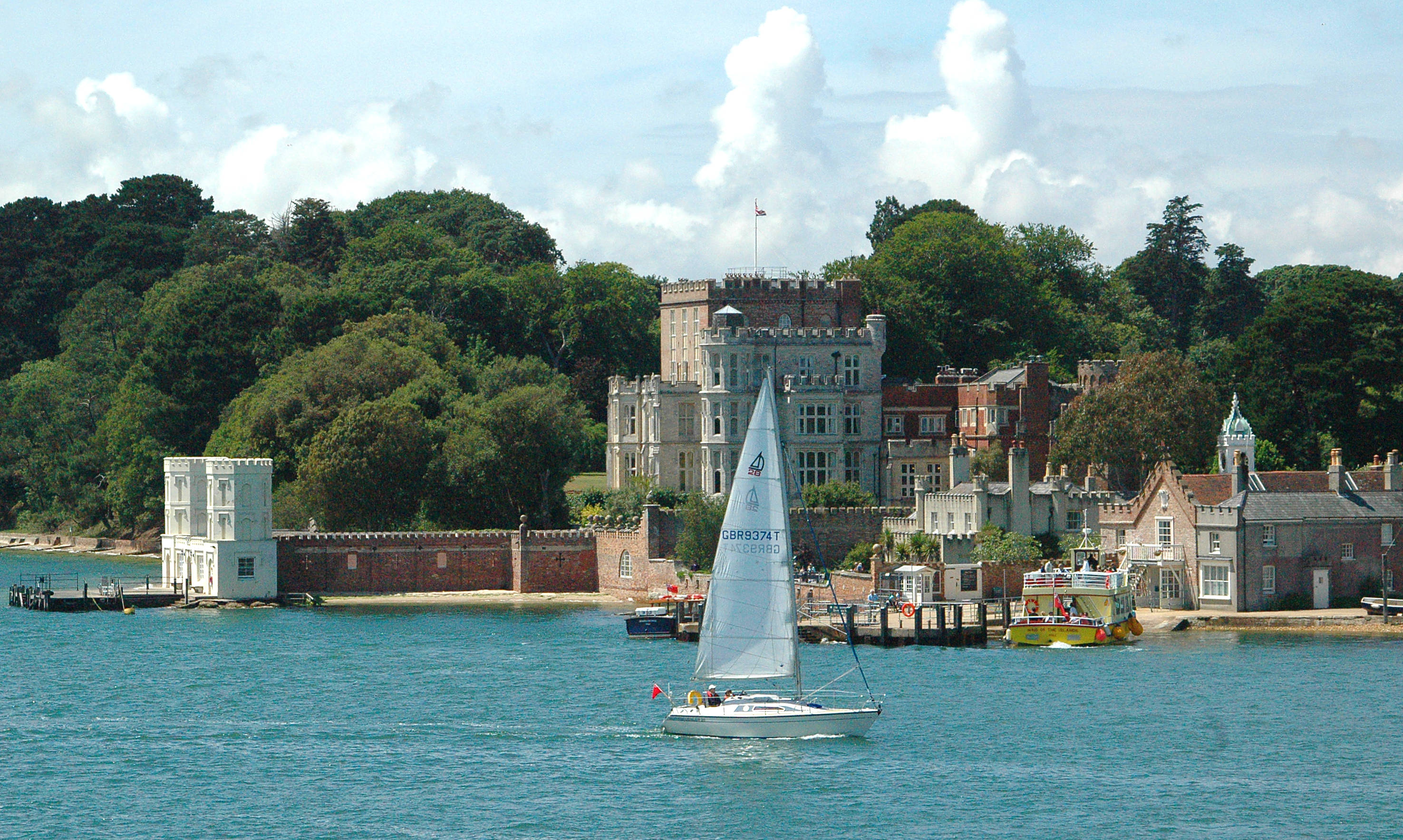
- The castle and piers on Brownsea Island

- Location within Dorset
- OS grid reference: SZ019879
- Civil parish: Studland
- Unitary authority: Dorset
- Ceremonial county: Dorset
- Region: South West
- Country: England
- Sovereign state: United Kingdom
- Post town: POOLE
- Postcode district: BH13
- Dialling code: 01202
- Police: Dorset
- Fire: Dorset and Wiltshire
- Ambulance: South Western
- UK Parliament: South Dorset

Brownsea Island is the largest of the islands in Poole Harbour, in the county of Dorset, England. The island is owned by the National Trust, with the northern half managed by the Dorset Wildlife Trust. Much of the island is open to the public and includes areas of woodland and heath with a wide variety of wildlife, together with cliff top views across Poole Harbour and the Isle of Purbeck.

The island was the location of an experimental camp in 1907 that preceded the publication of Scouting for Boys and The Scout magazine in 1908. Access is by public ferry or private boat; in 2017 the island received 133,340 visitors. The island's name probably comes from Old English Brūnoces īeg = "Brūnoc's island".

== Geography ==
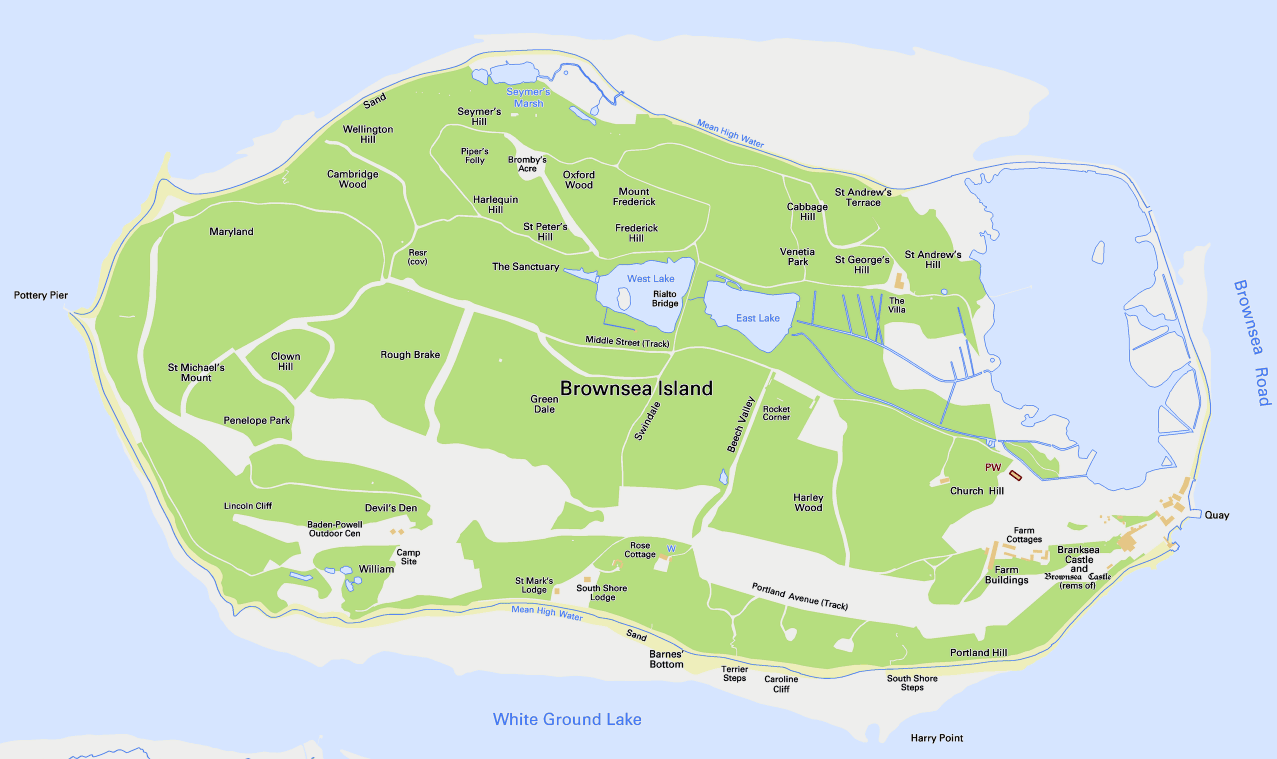
Map of Brownsea Island

Brownsea Island is the largest of eight islands in the harbour. The island can be reached by one of the public ferries or by private boat. There is a wharf and a small dock near the main castle. The island is 1 1/2 miles (2.4 km) long and 3/4 mile (1.2 km) wide and consists of 500 acres (200 ha) of woodland (pine and oak), heathland and salt-marsh.

The entire island, except the church and a few other buildings which are leased or managed by third parties, is owned by the National Trust. Most of the buildings are situated near the small landing stage. The northern portion of the island is a Nature Reserve managed by Dorset Wildlife Trust and an important habitat for birds; this part of the island has limited public access. A small portion to the southeast of the island, along with Brownsea Castle, is leased to the John Lewis Partnership for use as a holiday hotel by partners, and is not open to the public.

The island forms part of the Studland civil parish within the Dorset unitary authority. It is within the South Dorset constituency of the House of Commons. Until 31 January 2020, it was also within the South West England constituency of the European Parliament.

== Ecology ==
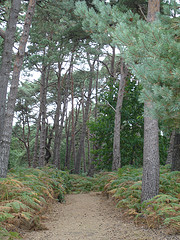
Woods on the island

Brownsea Island has built up on a bare sand and mud bank deposited in the shallow harbour. Ecological succession has taken place on the island to create topsoil able to support ecosystems.

The nature reserve on the island is leased from the National Trust by Dorset Wildlife Trust. This reserve includes a brackish lagoon and area of woodland. Other ecosystems on the island include salt marsh, reedbed, two freshwater lakes, alder carr, coniferous woodland, deciduous woodland and arboretum. In the past invasive species such as rhododendrons, also non-native, were introduced to the island, but the trusts have cleared many areas. The entire island is designated a Site of Special Scientific Interest.

=== Wildlife ===
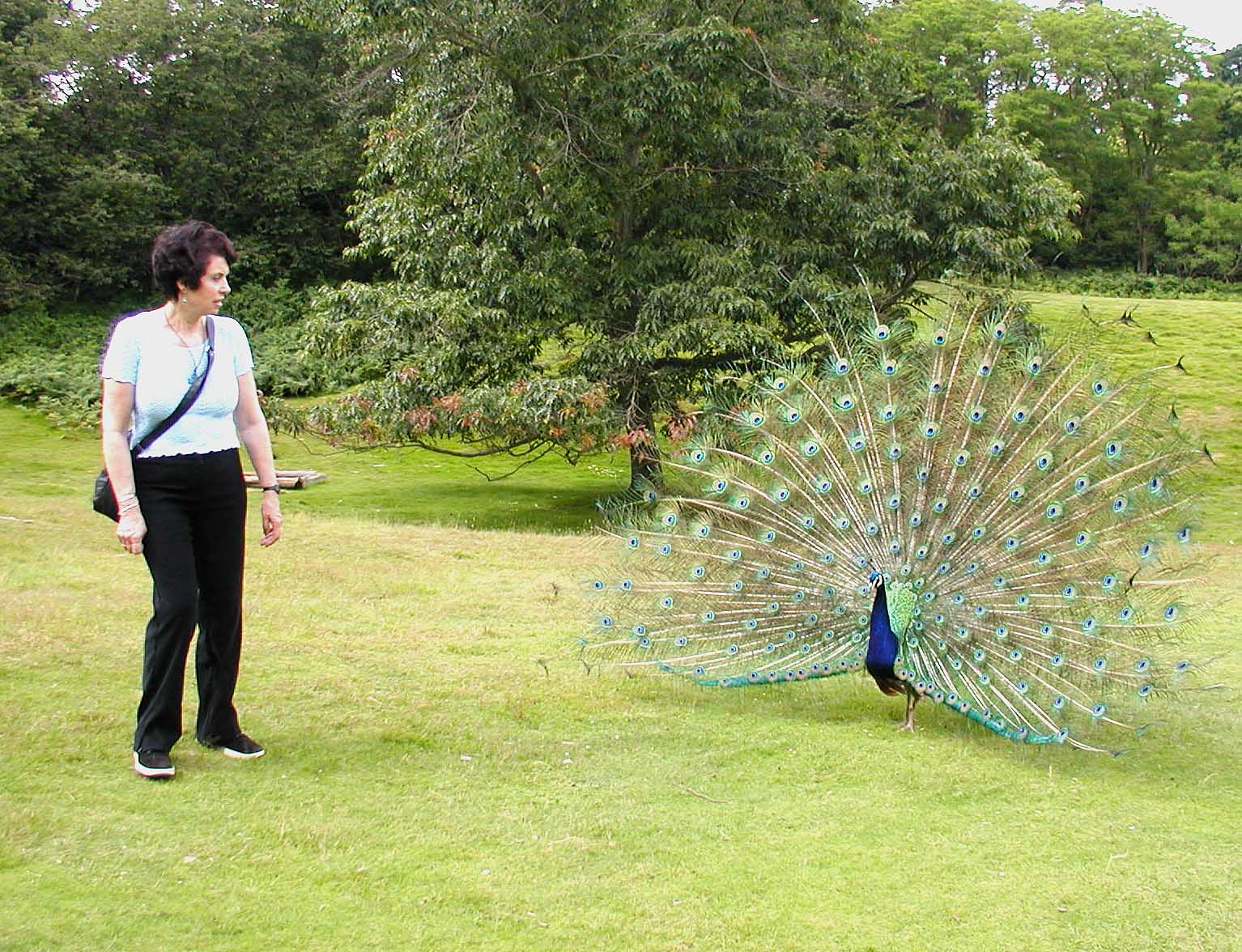
A peacock displays to a visitor

The island is one of the few places in southern England where indigenous red squirrels survive, largely because non-native grey squirrels have never been introduced to the island. The Brownsea red squirrel population is the only population known in the UK to carry the human form of the bacteria stem Mycobacterium leprae that causes leprosy in humans. Brownsea also has a small ornamental population of peacocks. The island has a heronry, in which both grey heron and little egret nest.

There is a large population of non-native sika deer on the island. In the past the numbers have been higher than the island can sustain and have overgrazed. To try to limit damage to trees and other vegetation by deer, areas of the island have been fenced off to provide areas of undamaged woodland to allow other species such as red squirrels to thrive.

The lagoon is noted for the large population of common tern and sandwich tern in summer, and a very large flock of avocets in winter, when more than 50 per cent of the British population (over 1500) can be present.

Some imported stonework and statuary on the island serves as a habitat for a Mediterranean land snail, Papillifera bidens.

== History ==
=== Early history ===
The first records of inhabitants on Brownsea Island occurred in the 9th century, when a small chapel and hermitage were built by monks from Cerne Abbey near Dorchester. The chapel was dedicated to St Andrew and the only resident of the island was a hermit, who may have administered to the spiritual welfare of sailors passing through Poole Harbour. In 1015, Canute led a Viking raid to the harbour and used Brownsea as a base to sack Wareham and Cerne Abbey. In the 11th century the owner of the island was Bruno, who was Lord of the manor of Studland. Following his invasion of England, William the Conqueror gave Studland, which included Brownsea, to his half-brother, Robert de Mortain. In 1154, King Henry II granted the Abbot of Cerne the right of wreck for the island and the abbey continued to control the interests of Brownsea for the following 350 years.

=== Tudor period and the Civil War ===
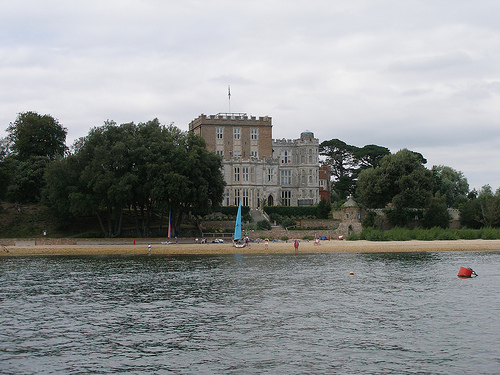
Brownsea Castle

After the dissolution of the monasteries, control of Brownsea passed to the Crown. Henry VIII recognised the island's strategic importance of guarding the narrow entrance to the expanding port of Poole. As part of a deterrent to invasion forces from Europe, the island was fortified in 1547 by means of a blockhouse, which became known as Brownsea Castle. In the following centuries, the island passed into the hands of a succession of various owners.

In 1576, Queen Elizabeth I made a gift of Brownsea to one of her court favourites and rumoured lover, Sir Christopher Hatton. During the English Civil War, Poole sided with Parliament and garrisoned Brownsea Castle. Colonel Thomas Pride, the instigator of Pride's Purge– the only military coup d'état in English history – was stationed on the island in 1654. Sir Robert Clayton, a Lord Mayor of London and wealthy merchant became owner in the mid-1650s and after his death in 1707 the island was sold to William Benson, a Whig Member of Parliament and architect. He converted the castle into a residence and was responsible for introducing many varieties of trees to the island.

=== Industrial plans ===
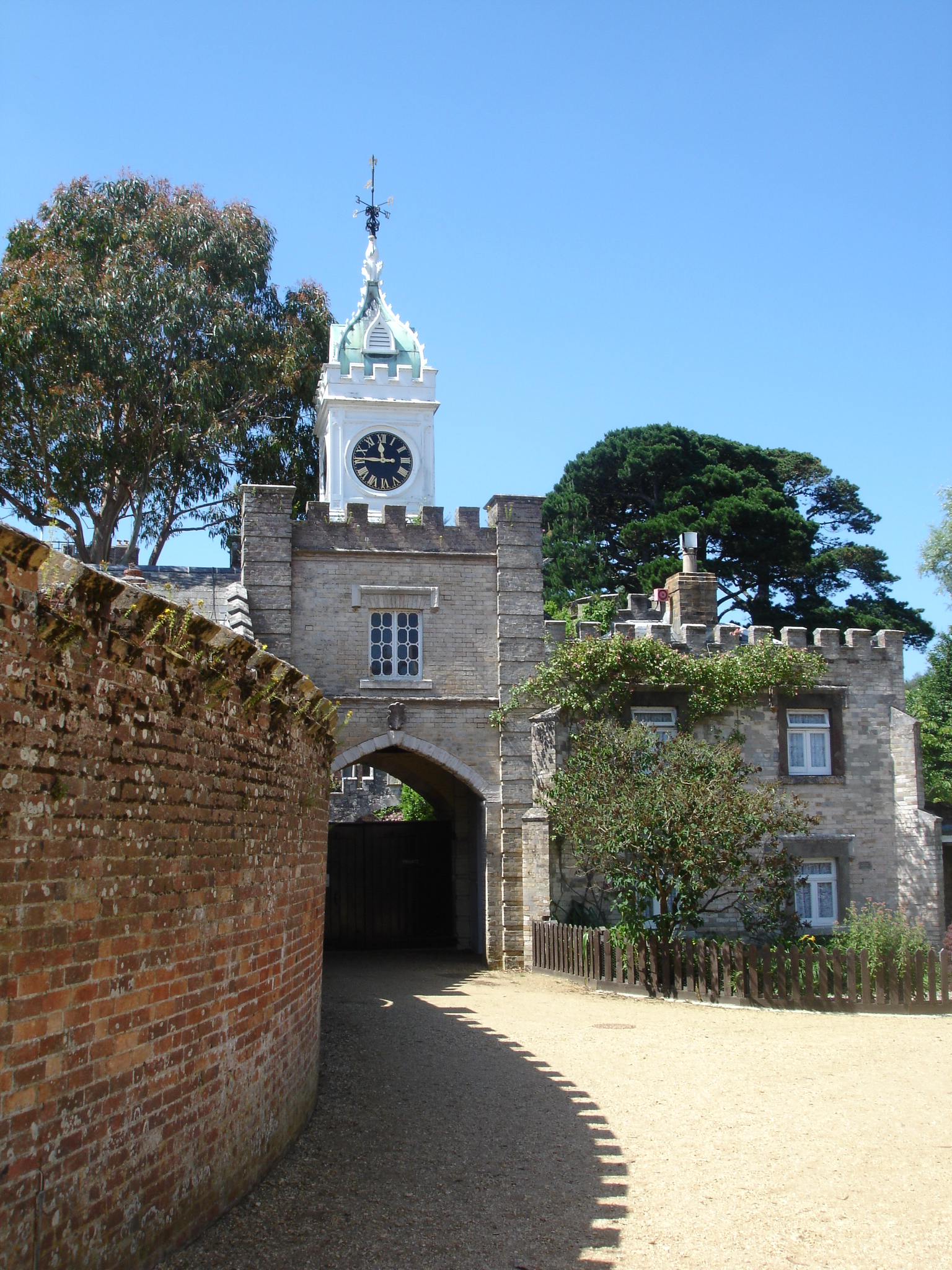
The mock Tudor entrance added in the mid-1850s by William Waugh

In 1765 Sir Humphrey Sturt, a local landowner and MP purchased the island, which in turn passed to his sons. Sturt expanded the castle and records suggest that he spent £50,000 on enhancing the island's gardens. Sir Augustus John Foster, a retired British diplomat, bought the island in 1840. Foster experienced bouts of depression and died in Brownsea Castle in 1848 when he slit his throat. In 1852 Brownsea was again up for sale and was sold for £13,000. It was purchased by William Waugh, a former Colonel in the British Army in the belief he could exploit the white clay deposits on the island to manufacture high-quality porcelain.

A three-storey pottery was built in southwest corner of the island together with a tramway to transport the clay from clay pits in the north. He hoped the clay would be of the same quality as the nearby Furzebrook clay, but it turned out to be suitable only for sanitary ware. The company employed more than 200 people, but by 1887 the venture closed owing to a lack of demand and the poor quality of the clay.

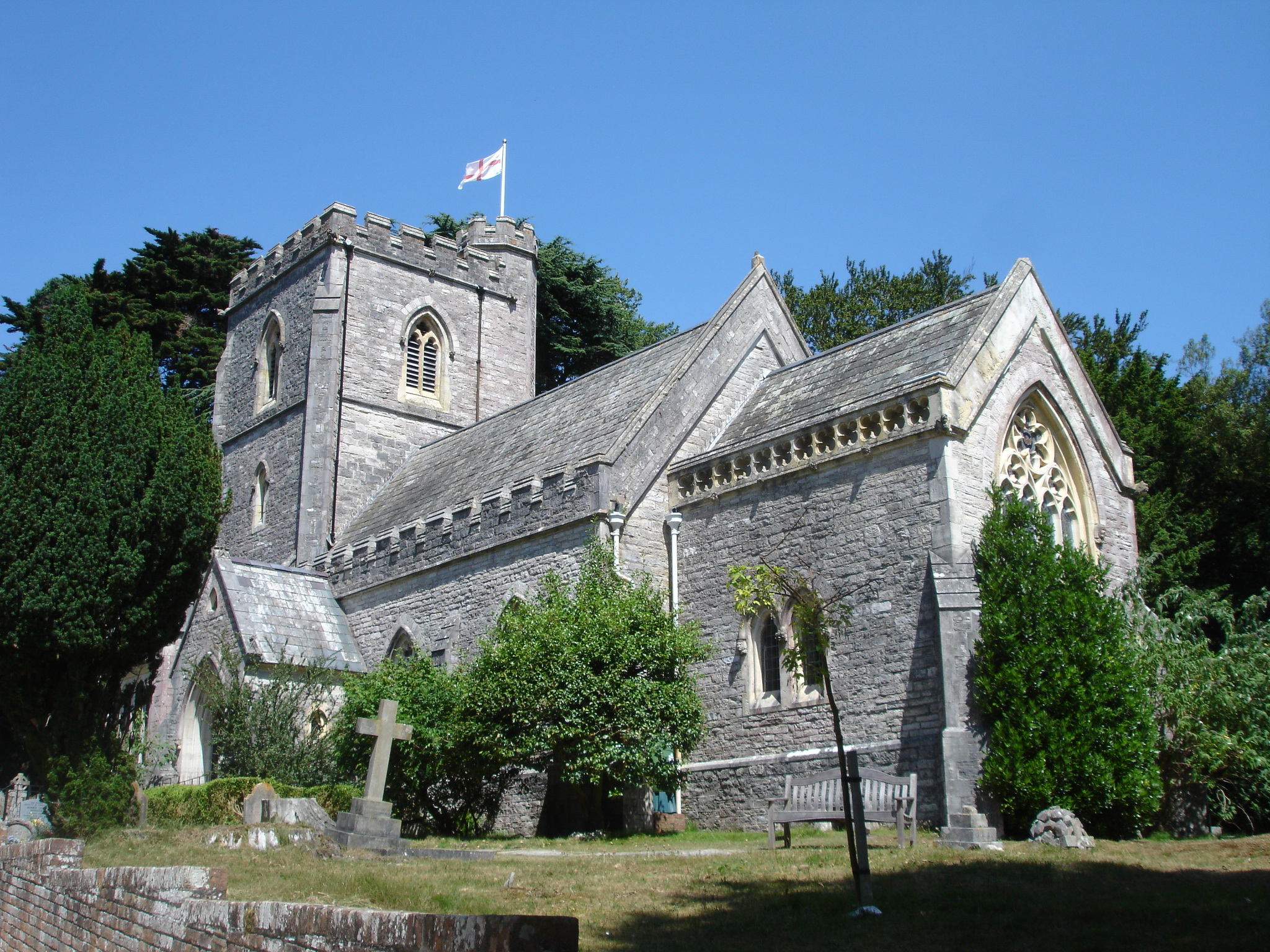
St Mary's Church, built in 1854

Traces of these activities remain today, mainly as building foundations and pottery fragments. Waugh was also responsible for expanding the number of buildings on the island – creating the now ruined village of Maryland (named after Waugh's wife), as well as adding a new gatehouse and tower in the Tudor style. Waugh also paid for the construction of a new pier, adorned with castellated watch towers. Another large expenditure was the construction of St Mary's church, built in the Gothic style, and also named after his wife. The foundation stone was laid by Sir Harry Smith in 1853 and construction was completed a year later. Inside the church there is a monument to Waugh as well as the tomb of the late owner Charles van Raalte. In the church, Scout and Girl Guide flags line either side of the main altar.

After falling heavily into debt, the Waughs fled to Spain. The island was acquired by creditors and sold in 1873 to George Cavendish-Bentinck, who added Jersey cows to Brownsea and expanded the island's agriculture. He filled the island with several Italian Renaissance sculptures, some of which still decorate the church and the quay. The 1881 census recorded a total population of 270 people on the island, the majority of whom provided a labour force for the pottery works. After his death, the island was sold to Kenneth Robert Balfour in 1891. Following the introduction of electric lighting, the castle was gutted by fire in 1896. It was subsequently rebuilt and, in 1901, Balfour put the island up for sale.

=== 20th century ===
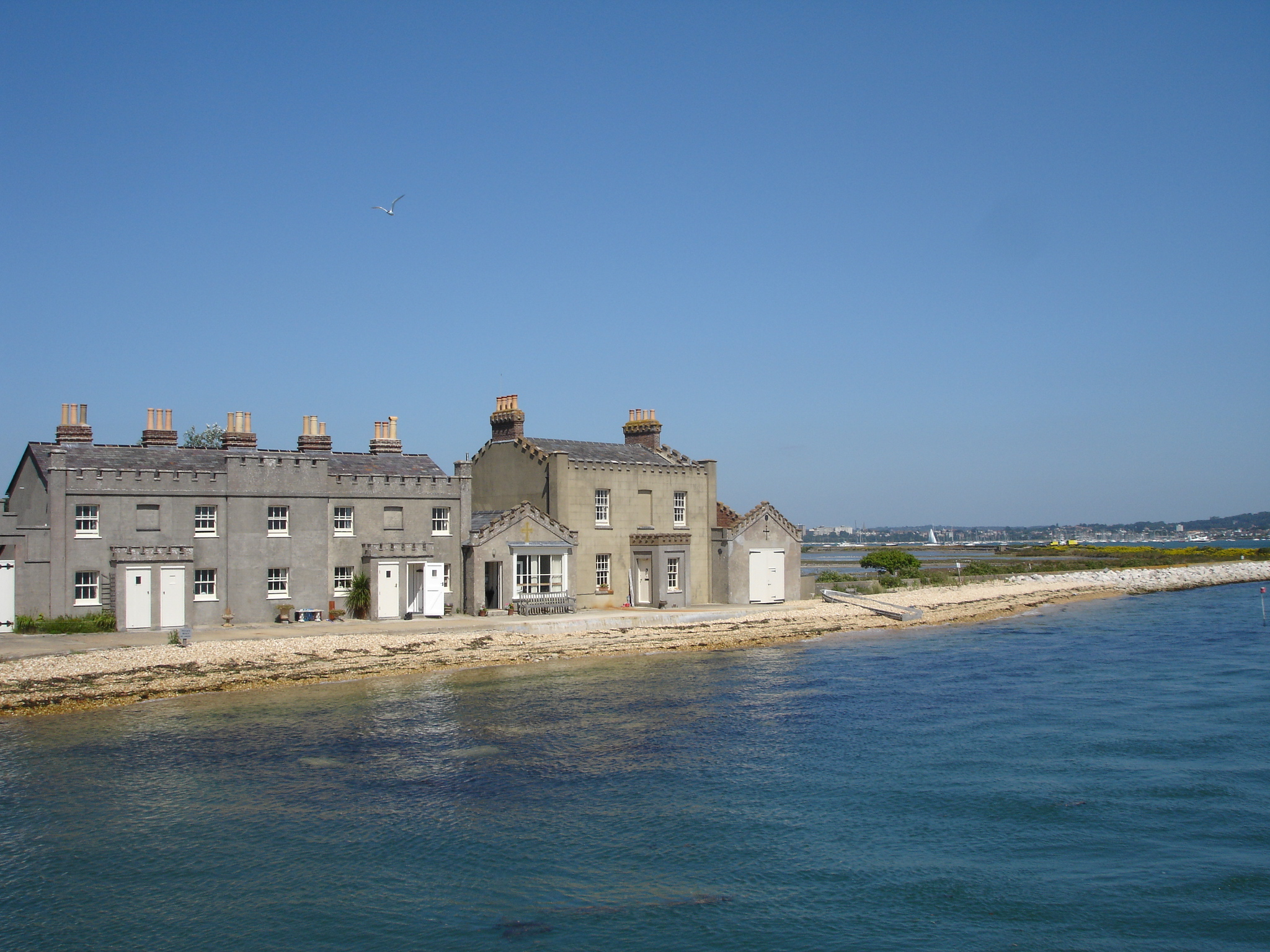
Cottages at the eastern end of the island

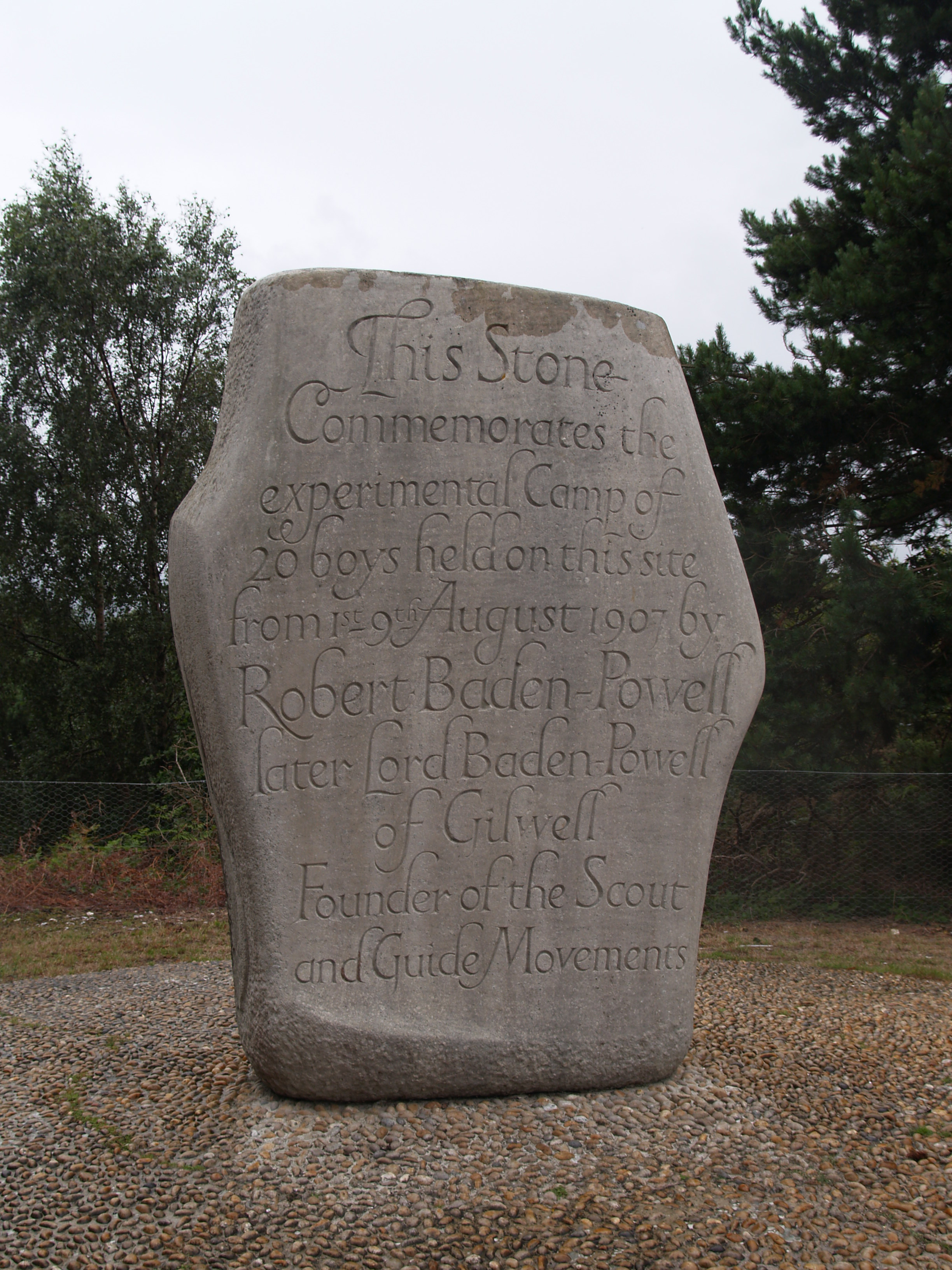
Stone on Brownsea Island commemorating the experimental camp. Unveiled on 1 August 1967.

The island was purchased by wealthy stockbroker Charles van Raalte who used the island as a residential holiday retreat. During this time the castle was renovated and served as host to famous visitors such as Guglielmo Marconi. Robert Baden-Powell had met the van Raaltes at an angling house party in Ireland. van Raalte suggested his Brownsea Island as the venue for Baden-Powell's experimental camp for boys in the summer of 1907. Brownsea was largely self-supporting, with a kitchen garden and a dairy herd. Many of the pottery factory workers had stayed on after it closed, farming and working for the owners.

Charles van Raalte died in Calcutta in February 1908 and his wife eventually left the island in 1925.

In 1927, the island was purchased at auction by Mary Bonham-Christie for £125,000. Her entire family were from the London area and Kent - except that her daughter's husband's first cousin's husband was Arthur Soames whose family lived in Lilliput, within view of Brownsea Island. Arthur's sister was Olave Soames, the wife of Robert Baden-Powell.

A recluse by nature, Mrs Bonham-Christie ordered a mass eviction of the Brownsea's residents to the mainland. Most of the island was abandoned and gradually reverted to natural heath and woodland. In 1934, a wild fire caused devastation after burning for a week. Much of the island was reduced to ashes, and the buildings to the east were only saved by a change of wind direction. Traumatised by the event, Bonham-Christie banned all public access to the island for the rest of her life.

In May and June 1940, a refugee camp was set up on Church Field; 3,000 Dutch and Belgian refugees arrived over 6 weeks. Some of the Dutch refugee boats were then used in the evacuation of the troops from Dunkirk. During the Second World War large flares were placed on the western end of the island to mislead Luftwaffe bombers away from the port of Poole. The decoy saved Poole and Bournemouth from 1,000 tonnes (160,000 st) of German bombs, but the deserted village of Maryland was destroyed.

In April 1961, Bonham-Christie died at 96 years old and her grandson gave the island to the Treasury to pay her death duties, but the Treasury only deals with money, so accepted the Island on condition that it be bought from them by the National Trust, for £100,000. The National Trust, in 1962, agreed to buy the island from the Treasury, but could only provide £25,000. The Dorset Wildlife Trust, for £25,000, leased a nature reserve on the north of the island, a sum raised by a campaign started by local conservationist, Helen Brotherton. The John Lewis Partnership, also for £25,000, bought a 99-year lease of the castle and its grounds for use as a holiday hotel for staff, and also renovated the castle. Olave, Lady Baden-Powell instigated a fundraising campaign in the Scout & Guide Movements that also raised £25,000; this was given to the National Trust for that purpose and so the island passed into their ownership.

The island had been neglected for many years. Work was carried out to prepare the island for visitors; tracks were cleared through areas overgrown with rhododendrons and firebreaks were created to prevent repetition of the 1934 fire. Working parties of Scouts and Guides camped on the island to carry out this work. The castle was renovated. The island was opened to the public on Wednesday 15 May 1963 by Olave, Lady Baden-Powell at a ceremony attended by surviving members of the 1907 camp. Soon after Brownsea Island was opened to the public, it was attracting more than 10,000 visitors a year. Larger boats means that today the island attracts some 110,000 visitors annually, but numbers have to be restricted to preserve the nature of the island.

Since 1964, the island has been host to the Brownsea Open Air Theatre, annually performing the works of William Shakespeare. Brownsea has a visitor centre and museum, displaying the island's history. There is also a newly located shop and cafe, with one holiday cottage on the quay. At the Scout camp, at the south-west of the island, there is an outdoor centre and a trading post shop which is focused on the Scout movement.

=== 21st century ===
The Dorset Wildlife Trust operates on the island from The Villa, previously the island vicarage. The island has a single post box that is emptied each day. In October 2008, the island was featured on BBC One's annual Autumnwatch programme.

There is an annual round-the-island swim of 4 1/2 miles (7.2 km) run by the RLSS Poole Lifeguards.

== Scouts and Brownsea Island ==
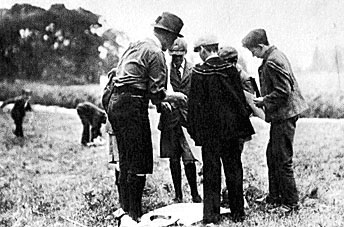
Robert Baden-Powell at the first Scout encampment on Brownsea Island held in August 1907

From 1 August until 8 August 1907, Robert Baden-Powell held an experimental camp on the island, to test out his Boy Scout ideas. He gathered 21 boys of mixed social backgrounds (from boys' schools in the London area and a section of boys from the Poole, Parkstone, Hamworthy, Bournemouth, and Winton Boys' Brigade units) and held a week-long camp. The boys took part in activities such as camping, observation, woodcraft, chivalry, lifesaving and patriotism. Following the camp, in 1908, Baden-Powell's book Scouting for Boys and The Scout magazine were published and the Scout movement grew rapidly.

Boy Scouts camped on the island until the 1930s, when all public access to the island was forbidden by the island's owner. After ownership of the island transferred to the National Trust, a permanent 20 hectares (49 acres) Scout camp site was opened in 1963 by Olave Baden-Powell. In August 2007, 100 years after Baden-Powell's experimental camp, Brownsea Island was the focus of celebrations of the centenary. Four camps were set up on the island including a replica of the original 1907 camp, and hundreds of Scouts and Girl Guides from 160 countries travelled to the island to take part in the celebrations. Also present on the island that day were 17 descendants of Baden-Powell.

== Twinning ==
Brownsea Island is twinned with:

- Île de Tatihou, France
