= Walwick Grange =

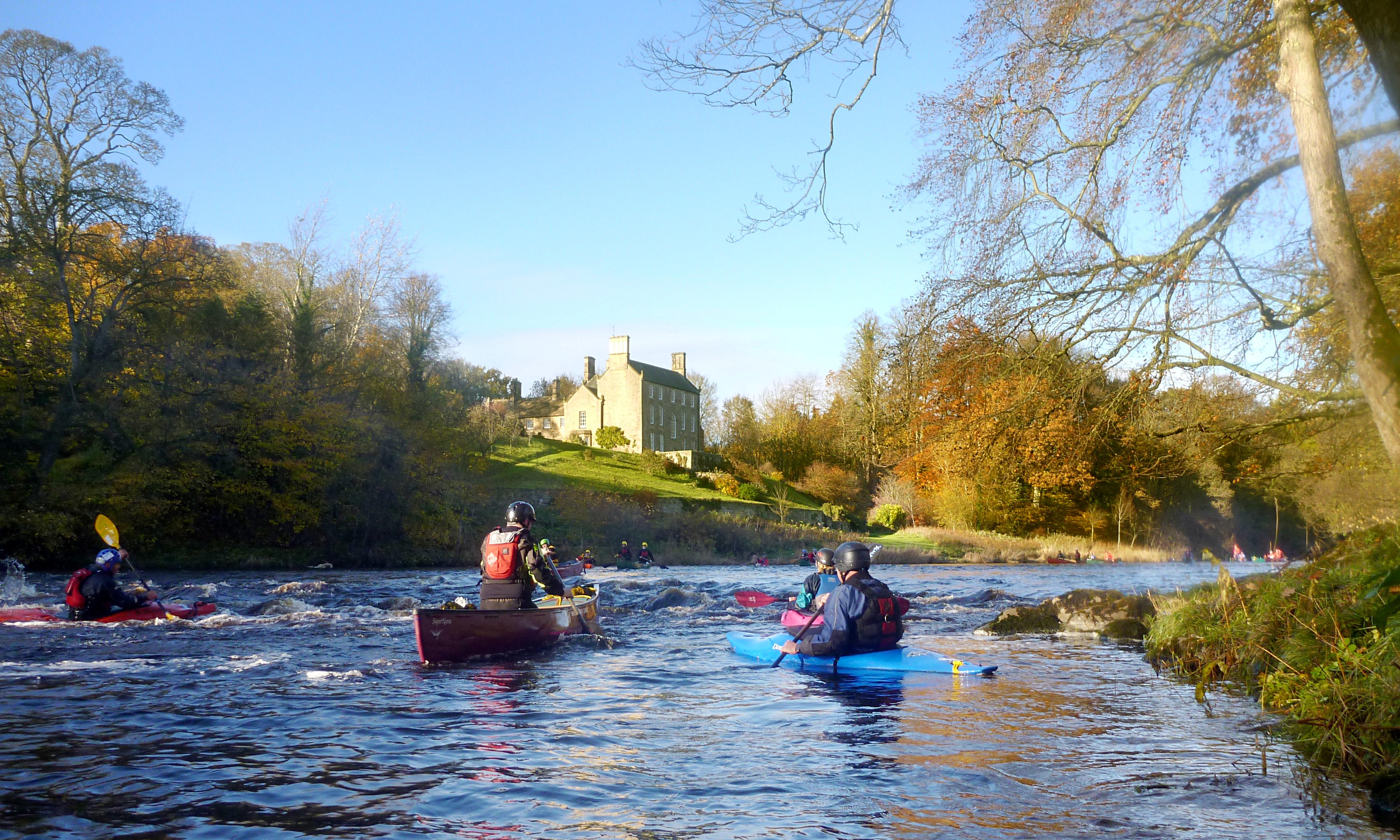
- Walwick Grange from the River Tyne

- Location in Northumberland

General information
- Location: Northumberland, England, UK
- Coordinates: 55.018°N 2.146°W
- OS grid: NZ907693

Walwick Grange is a privately owned 18th-century country house ( now a farmhouse) situated on the bank of the River North Tyne close to Hadrian's Wall at Warden, Northumberland. It is a Grade II* listed building.

Walwick was the seat of the Errington family from the mid 16th century. The three-storey five-bayed house was built, probably on the site of a medieval tower house, in the early 18th century.

William Errington of Walwick Grange was High Sheriff of Northumberland in 1739. His son John built a new house at Chesters (Humshaugh) in the 1770s.

Medieval fishponds nearby have Scheduled Ancient Monument status.
