= George Errington (martyr) =

English Roman Catholic layman and martyr

- Born: Hurst Castle, Northumberland, England
- Died: 29 November 1596, York, England
- Martyred by: Queen Elizabeth I of England
- Means of martyrdom: Hanging, drawing and quartering
- Venerated in: Great Britain
- Beatified: 22 November 1987, by Pope John Paul II
- Feast: 4 May

George Errington was an English Roman Catholic layman who is honoured as a martyr by the Catholic Church.

== Life ==
George Errington was born around 1553 in the Hirst area of what is now Ashington, Northumberland. He was an associate of John Boste, a priest who ran a clandestine operation out of South Shields, assisting candidates for the priesthood to get to the continent for training. Two years before his own death, Errington had ridden with Boste on his last journey from York to Durham.

Errington was first arrested on Tyneside in 1585 accused of attempting to help smuggle a candidate for the priesthood to the continent. Released on bail in February, 1586, he was arrested again in May, 1591 but escaped from York Castle the following December.

Errington was arrested a third time towards the end of the 1593 and convicted of "persuading to Popery". Convicted of treason for this under the Penal Laws enacted under Queen Elizabeth I, he was condemned to death. For this he suffered hanging, drawing and quartering at York on 29 November 1596.

Martyred with Errington were Henry Abbot, William Knight and William Gibson, who had all been caught up in the plot by the minister. Except for Abbot who was executed and beatified separately, they were all beatified by Pope John Paul II as among the Eighty-five martyrs of England and Wales.
