= Mary Bonham-Christie =

Owner of Brownsea Island

Mary Bonham-Christie (née Mary Florence Whitburn; 23 July 1865 – 28 April 1961) called "the Demon of Brownsea", was the reclusive owner of Brownsea Island in Poole Harbour, Dorset from 1927 until her death in 1961.

== Family background ==
Mary Florence Whitburn was born in Wandsworth, South London, in 1865. She was the daughter of Charles Joseph Sofer Whitburn (died 2 November 1911) and Fanny Hales Whitburn, of Addington Park in Kent, who were married in 1863. She had six siblings: two elder sisters, Ada and Susannah; two elder brothers, Thomas and Edward Harry; and younger twin brothers, Sofer and William, born in 1867.

=== Parents ===
When her father Charles Whitburn died, his addresses at the time were Addington Park, Maidstone; 16 Ennismore Gardens, Middlesex (recorded as his place of death); and 17 Clements Lane, London. Probate was granted to Charles William Sofer Whitburn, banker and to Mary Florence Christie. (Note: Probate granted in London on 5 January 1912.) His "effects" (property and belongings) were £1,476,795 2s. 7d (about £146 million in 2024).

Her mother Fanny died in the registration district of St George Hanover Square on 3 December 1921. She was also of the Ennismoore Gardens address. Administration of her estate was granted in London on 21 January, again to Charles William Sofer Whitburn and Mary Florence Christie. (Note: The effects of her mother amounted to £425,48 12s. 0d (about £1.75 million in 2024).)

== Marriage and descendants ==
Mary married Robert Bonham Bax Christie in 1889. Mary's husband died in 1931. (Note: Robert Bonham Bax Christie died 27 April 1931, aged 72 at 28 Marloes Road, Kensington, Middlesex. His address was 27 Maxilla Gardens, Ladbroke Grove, Middlesex. Probate was granted in London on 12 June to his son Robert Arthur Bonham Christie. His effects amounted to £8176 4s. 6d (about £470,000 in 2024).) Probate on his estate was granted to his son, described as a "landed proprietor".

Mary and Robert had a daughter, Elsie, born at Highworth, in 1890 and a son, Robert Arthur, born in Malling in 1893. Robert Arthur married Kathleen E Leech in Chelsea in 1917. Robert and Kathleen went on to have a son, John, born 1918 in St George Hanover Square, who inherited his grandmother Mary's estate upon her death. Elsie married Clement Woodbine Parish in St George Hanover Square in 1914. They had three sons and a daughter:

- Charles Woodbine Parish (1915 – 21 April 1943), born in Upton. He served as a Flight Lieutenant in the Second World War (Service Number 81927; 7 Sqdn. RAFVR) and is buried in the Commonwealth War Graves annexe to the Svino Churchyard, Denmark.
- Michael (born 1916, Aylesbury)
- Godfrey (1919–1973)
- Elizabeth Yvonne

== Owner of Brownsea Island ==
Mary Bonham-Christie purchased Brownsea Island at auction in 1927, for £125,000 (£6.6 million in 2024). She gave the island's 200 residents notice to leave, and banned hunting and fishing on grounds of animal cruelty. A protracted legal battle ensued, in the course of which, in 1934, a fire consumed much of the island; the cause of the fire was never determined. Local rumour at the time insinuated the fire may have stemmed from the acrimony caused by the eviction of islanders, although Bonham-Christie blamed the Boy Scouts. She forbade them to camp on the island from this time. Fearing further threats, she hired a bodyguard to eject intruders from the island.

While unpopular, her minimal interference with the island's natural contents meant that it became a flourishing habitat for native red squirrels, deer and Sandwich tern, avocet, and other wildlife. "The old lady knew she wasn't popular but I don't think she cared", said a former boatman who served the island during her tenure there.

== Death and legacy ==
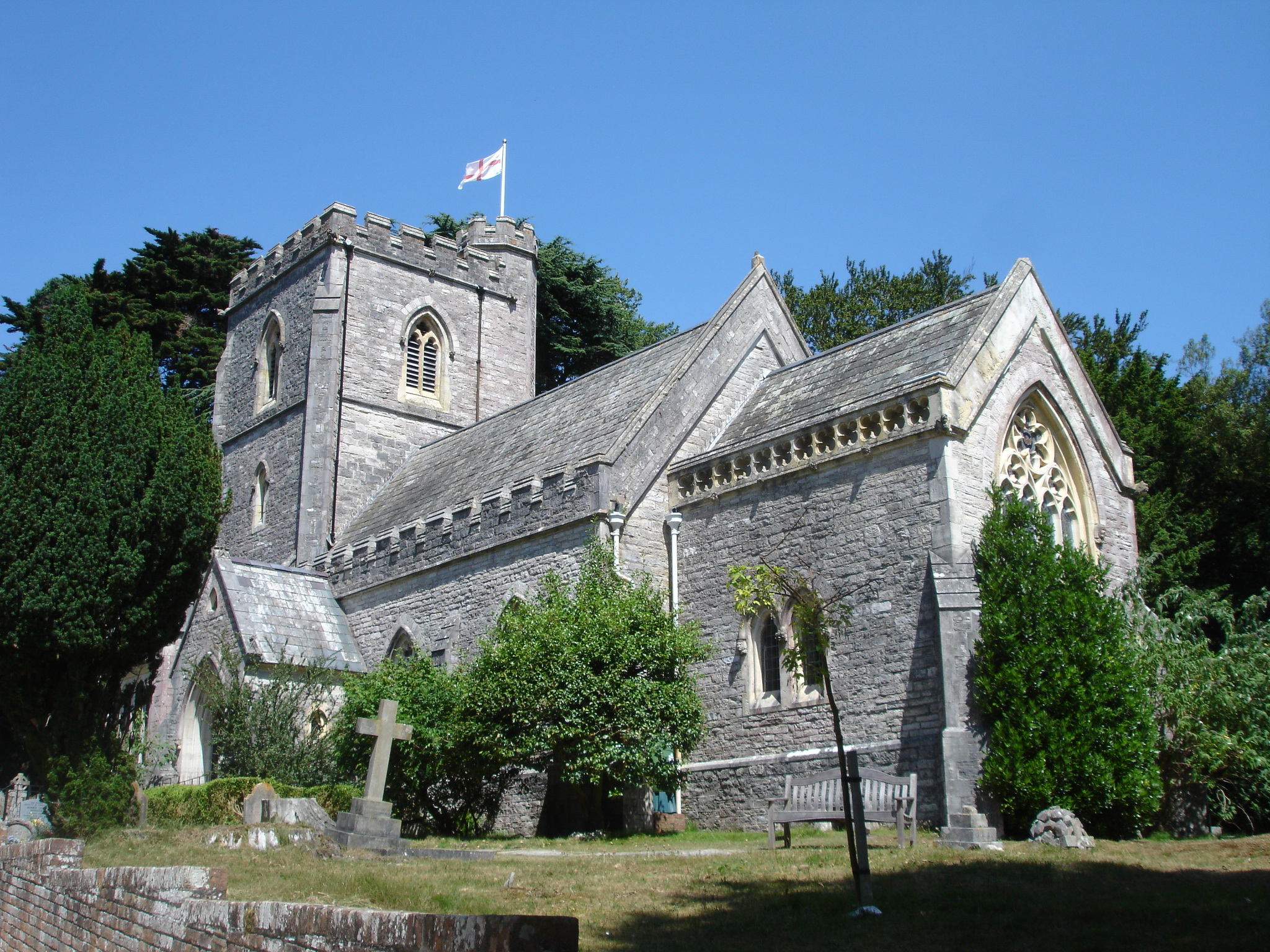
St. Mary's Church on Brownsea Island

Mary Bonham-Christie died on 28 April 1961, aged 96 years, in a local (off-island) nursing home, where she had been moved that same day on doctor's orders, owing to her deteriorating health. There is a monument to Mary Bonham-Christie in the churchyard at Marston Bigot; her remains were cremated at Bournemouth, and although the local paper said her ashes were scattered at Brownsea Island, the memorial at Marston Bigot states that her ashes are at Bournemouth crematorium. In 2007, BBC Radio 4 broadcast For Nature, Not Humans, a half-hour documentary about Bonham-Christie and her effect on the island.

Her grandson and heir John Bonham-Christie had plans to develop the island. A group of environmental conservationists, led by Helen Brotherton, organised to oppose his plans. They succeeded in raising sufficient funds to persuade the Treasury to take Brownsea Island as settlement of death duties, which was accepted provided that the National Trust took over the island. However, this was also subject to payment to the Treasury of £100,000 – which the National Trust did not have. An arrangement was finally reached whereby three other parties contributed £25,000 each: The Dorset Wildlife Trust – provided they could run half the island; the John Lewis Partnership – for a 99-year lease of the castle and grounds (for staff holidays); and the Scout and Guide Movements – provided they could have access to the rest of the island for their members.
