= Pavel Kravař =

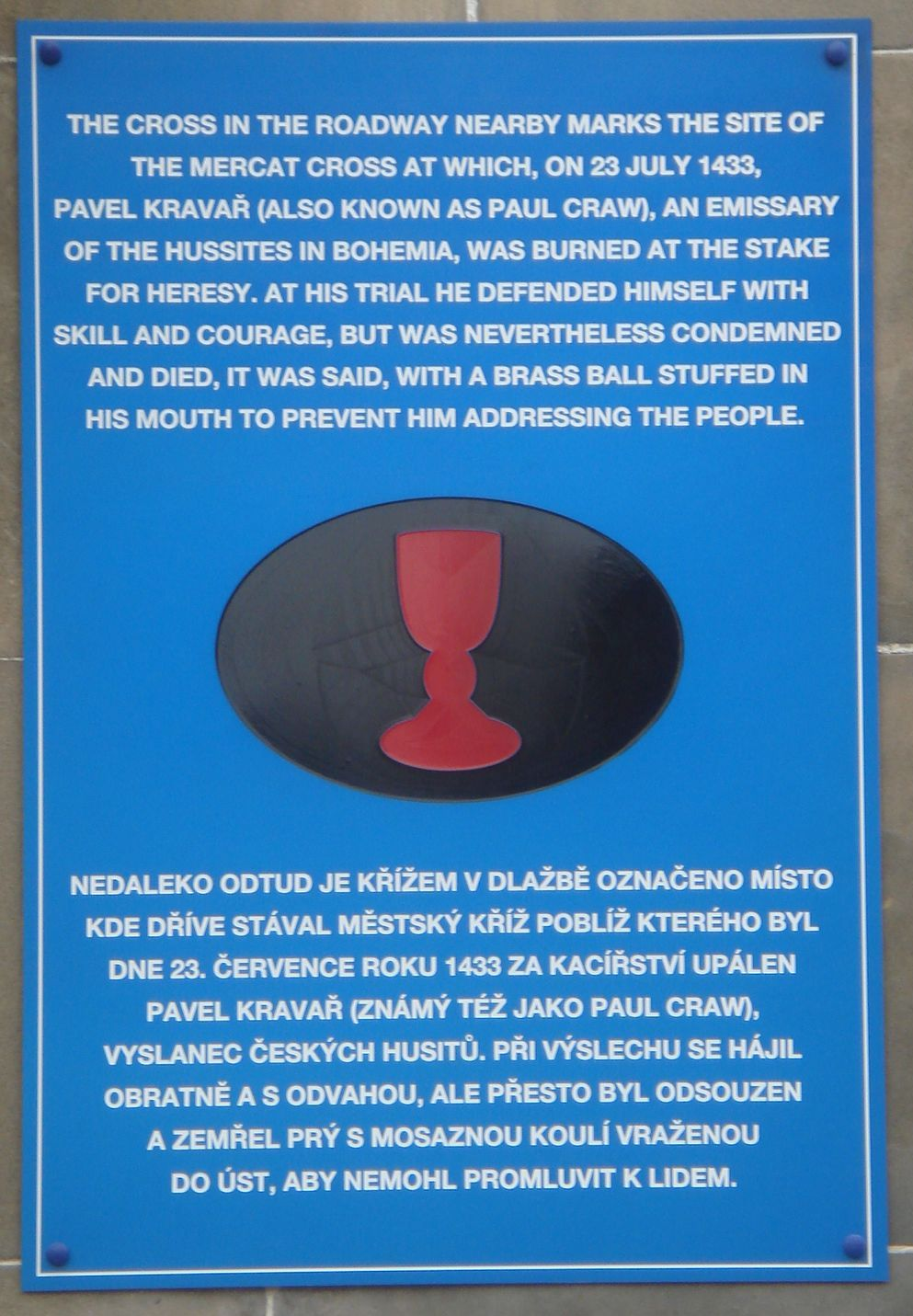
Bilingual memorial plaque in St Andrews with Hussite emblem

Pavel Kravař (c. 1391 – 23 July 1433), or Paul Crawar, Paul Craw, was a Hussite emissary from Bohemia who was burned at the stake for heresy at St Andrews in Scotland on 23 July 1433. He was the first of a succession of religious reformers who were martyred in the town during the course of the subsequent Protestant Reformation. (The others being: Patrick Hamilton in 1528, Henry Forest in 1533, George Wishart in 1546, and Walter Myln in 1558).

== Life ==
Pavel Kravař was probably a native of Kravaře, Opava District, Silesia (then Moravia), now part of the Czech Republic. After studying medicine at the University of Montpellier, he graduated as Master of Arts from the University of Paris in 1415. The following year, he entered the Faculty of Arts at the University of Prague, then a hotbed of Hussite activity. Around 1421, with the university now in decline, Pavel Kravař left Prague to become a physician in the service of the Polish King, Władysław II Jagiełło. He probably returned to the Bohemian capital in 1432 prior to undertaking his ill-fated mission to Scotland.

His journey to St Andrews, at the time the ecclesiastical centre of Scotland and the location of its only university, was most likely made in a vain attempt to gain allies, hopefully amongst Lollard sympathisers, for the Hussite cause at the Council of Basel, at which reconciliation was sought between the Hussites and the Catholic Church. Pavel Kravař's activities in St Andrews evidently met with the displeasure of the authorities there, particularly Henry Wardlaw, Bishop of St Andrews, who accused him of spreading the heretical ideas of Jan Hus and John Wyclif. At his trial he defended himself with skill and courage, but was nevertheless condemned and died, according to John Knox, with a brass ball stuffed in his mouth to prevent him addressing the people.

Pavel Kravař's execution is believed to have taken place at the centre of the market square in St Andrews, close to the former location of the Mercat Cross which is now marked with a cross of red stones set into the cobbled surface of the roadway. A memorial plaque, with an inscription in English and Czech languages, is located on a building nearby.

== See also ==
- List of Protestant martyrs of the Scottish Reformation
