= List of Protestant martyrs of the Scottish Reformation =

Protestant martyrs from Scotland

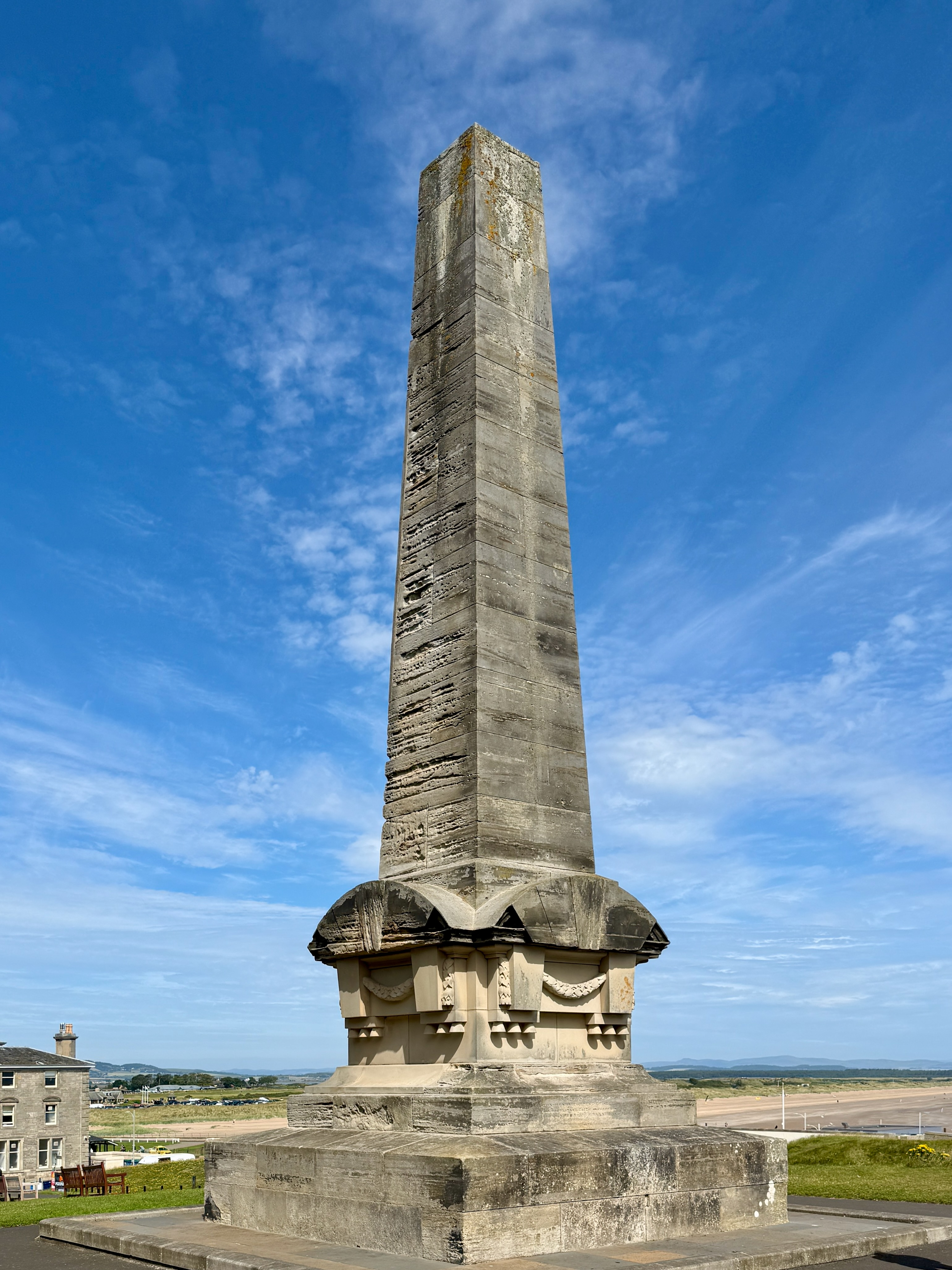
The Martyrs' Monument, St Andrews, which commemorates Patrick Hamilton, Henry Forrest, George Wishart and Walter Milne

Two people were executed under heresy laws during the reign of James I (1406–1437). Protestants were then executed during persecutions against Protestant religious reformers for their religious denomination during the reigns of James V (1513–1542) and Mary, Queen of Scots (1542–1567). The excesses of this period were recorded in Foxe's Book of Martyrs.

Name	Nationality/Residence	Description	Date of execution	Place of execution	References
John Resby	English	priest	1407/1422	Perth	
Pavel Kravař (Paul Crawar)	Bohemian	Hussite physician	23 July 1433	St Andrews	
Patrick Hamilton	Kincavil, West Lothian	priest - precentor of St Andrews Cathedral	29 February 1528	St Andrews	
Henry Forrest	Linlithgow, West Lothian	monk - Benedictine	1532 or 1533	St Andrews	
Norman Gourlay	Dollar, Clackmannanshire	priest - Vicar of Dollar	26 August 1534	Cross of Greenside, near Edinburgh	
David Stratton	Lauriston Castle, Aberdeenshire	brother of the Laird of Lauriston	26 August 1534	Cross of Greenside, near Edinburgh	
Thomas Forret	Dollar, Clackmannanshire	priest - Vicar of Dollar	28 February/1 March 1539	Castle Hill, Edinburgh	
Duncan Simpson	Stirling, Stirlingshire	priest	28 February/1 March 1539	Castle Hill, Edinburgh	
John Keillor	Stirling, Stirlingshire	friar - Dominican (blackfriar)	28 February/1 March 1539	Castle Hill, Edinburgh	
John Beveridge	Stirling, Stirlingshire	friar - Dominican (blackfriar)	28 February/1 March 1539	Castle Hill, Edinburgh	(Christian name not given)
Robert Forster	Stirling, Stirlingshire	notary	28 February/1 March 1539	Castle Hill, Edinburgh	
Jerome Russell	Taken at Dumfries	friar - Franciscan	1539	Glasgow	
Alexander Kennedy		"who passed not 18 years of age, one of excellent genius in Scottish poesy"	1539	Glasgow	(Christian name not given)
William Anderson	Perth	maltman	1544 (tried on 25 January)	Perth	
James Finlayson	Perth		1544 (tried on 25 January)	Perth	
James Hunter	Perth	flesher	1544 (tried on 25 January)	Perth	
Robert Lamb	Perth	merchant	1544 (tried on 25 January)	Perth	
James Raveleson	Perth	skinner	1544 (tried on 25 January)	Perth	
Hellen Stirk	Perth	wife of James Raveleson, skinner	1544 (tried on 25 January)	Perth	
George Wishart	Taken at Ormiston in East Lothian	schoolmaster and itinerant preacher	1 March 1546	St Andrews	
Adam Wallace	Fayle, Kyle, Ayrshire	"simple poor man"	1550	Edinburgh	
Walter Milne	Lunan, Angus	priest of the parish of Lunan	April 1558	St Andrews	

Martyrdom locations

== See also ==
- Patrick Hamilton (martyr)
- George Wishart
- Forty Martyrs of England and Wales
- List of Catholic martyrs of the English Reformation
- Saint John Ogilvie
- John Black (martyr)
- George Douglas (martyr)
- William Gibson (martyr)
- John Ingram (martyr)
- Patrick Primrose
- Hugh Barclay of Ladyland, David Graham, Laird of Fintry, Spanish blanks plot
- Alexander Cameron (priest)

== Sources ==
- Calderwood, David (1842). Thomson, Thomas (ed.). The history of the Kirk of Scotland. Vol. I. Edinburgh: Wodrow Society.
- Foxe, John (1583). Foxe's Book of Martyrs. Vol. 8.
- Knox, John (1846). Laing, David (ed.). The works of John Knox. Vol. 1. Edinburgh: Bannatyne Club.
- Knox, John (1868). Laing, David (ed.). The works of John Knox. Vol. 6. Edinburgh: Bannatyne Club.
- M'Crie, Thomas (1849). Sketches of Scottish Church History from the Reformation to the Revolution. Vol. 1. Edinburgh: John Johnstone.
