= Thomas Forrest =

Thomas Forrest may refer to:

- Thomas Forrest (navigator) (1729?–1802?), English employee of the British East India Company
- Thomas Forrest (politician) (1747–1825), American politician
- Thomas Forrest (colonist) (1572–1641), Gentleman founder of Jamestown Virginia Colony 1608
- Thomas Forrest (translator) (fl. 1580), English translator of three orations of Isocrates
- Thomas Forret or Forrest (died 1540), Scottish martyr

== See also ==
- Forrest Thomas (disambiguation)
