= Dorothy Walker (journalist and writer) =

British journalist and author

Dorothy Walker is a British journalist and author.

== Biography ==
She was educated at the Institute of Archaeology, University of London, where she gained a degree in archaeology. Her early career was in financial software in the City of London.

She has contributed to The Times, The Sunday Times, The Independent, The Guardian, The Daily Telegraph , The Evening Standard, The Scotsman and The Mail on Sunday and has been a regular columnist for the Times Educational Supplement. She wrote a regular column on science and technology for Saga Magazine.

Walker is author of Education in the Digital Age, a front-line report on the impact of information technology (IT) in education. She is a member of The Society of Authors.

She is a Past Prime Warden (Master) of The Worshipful Company of Basketmakers and a Trustee of the Basketmakers Charitable Trust. She served as a Director of The Guild of Freemen of the City of London, establishing and chairing the Guild’s Membership Committee for its first six years. She is a Trustee of All Hallows London Wall, one of the first examples of neoclassical architecture in Britain. She is past Chair of The Scottish Castles Association and served as Deacon of the Incorporation of Wrights, heading the Glasgow-based charity.

Walker is married to journalist Willy Newlands, former travel editor of the Daily Mail. They restored Lauriston Castle, Aberdeenshire, in the late Eighties with the help of architect Ian Begg.

As holder of the Barony of Miltonhaven (known as Lauriston until 1692), Lady Lauriston is Dorothy Newlands of Lauriston, Baroness of Miltonhaven.

== Awards and honours ==
She was voted National Newspaper Technology Journalist of the Year in the BT Technology Awards 1997–98.

Walker was first runner-up to Miss United Kingdom in 1977.

== Books ==
- Walker, Dorothy. Education in the Digital Age, Bowerdean (1998). ISBN 978-0-906097-89-2
