= Dundee Law =

Extinct volcano of Dundee, Scotland

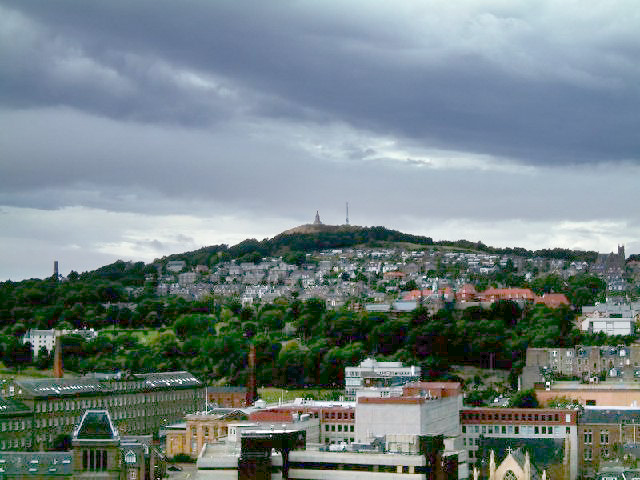
- Dundee Law as seen from The Old Steeple

Highest point
- Elevation: 174 m (571 ft)
- Prominence: 78 m (256 ft)
- Listing: Tump
- Coordinates: 56.469734°N 2.990000°W

Geography
- Dundee Law in the Dundee City council area. Dundee Law in Scotland
- Location: Dundee, Scotland

Geology
- Rock age: ~400-415 million years
- Mountain type(s): Crag and tail, Volcanic sill

Dundee Law is a hill in the centre of Dundee, Scotland, and is the highest point in the city. The Law is what remains of a volcanic sill, which is the result of volcanic activity around 400 million years ago. With a large war memorial at its summit, it is the most prominent feature on the local skyline.

== Geology ==
Dundee Law, which takes its name from a Scots word for a prominent hill, is an example of a volcanic sill. A volcanic area miles to the west forced lava through fissures in Old Red Sandstone. The subsequent action of rain, wind and ice eroded the sandstone, revealing the volcanic rock. Glaciers during the ice ages deposited more debris around the base, creating a crag and tail. The shallow gradient of the northern and eastern slopes of the law suggest a north-easterly movement of ice flows. The summit of the hill is over 150 metres (500 feet) above sea level. Despite the derivation of "law" making it tautological to do so, the Law is commonly referred to as the "Law Hill".

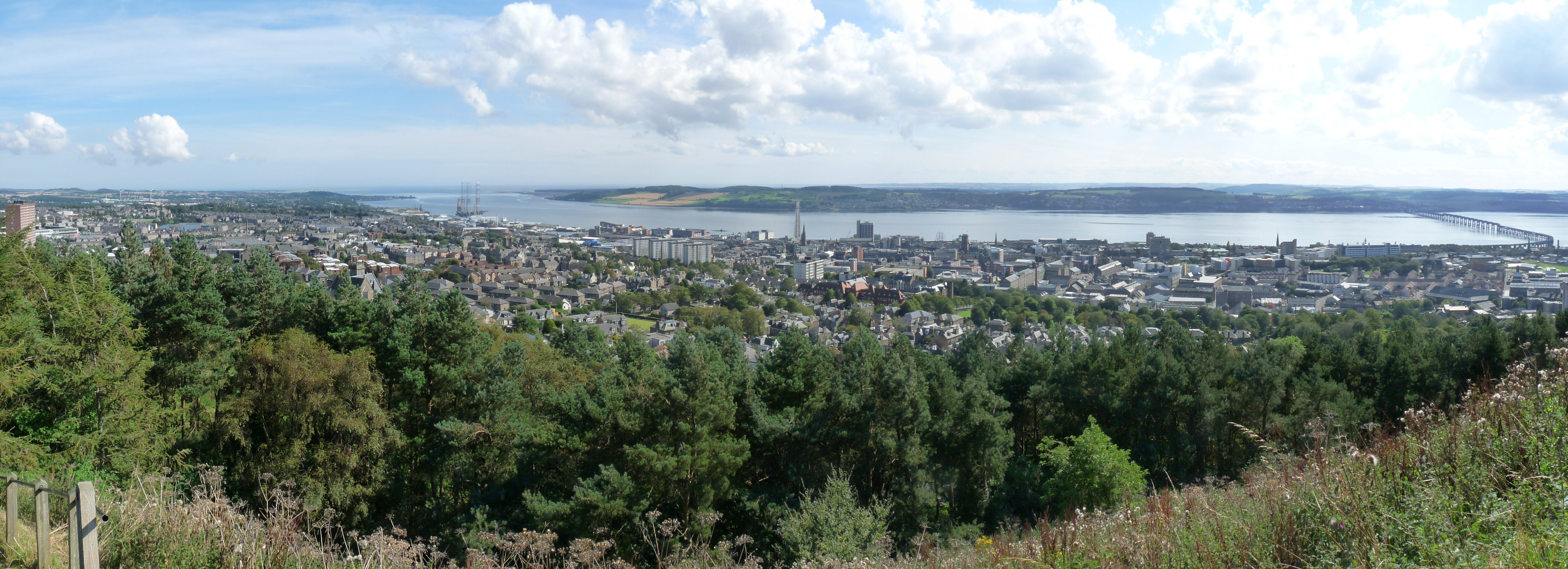
View of the city and the Firth of Tay as seen from Dundee Law

== History ==
Archaeological evidence of burials suggest that the Law may have been used by human settlers 3500 years ago. During the Iron Age it was the site of a Pictish settlement. Roman pottery has been found on the law, suggesting that the Romans may have used it as a lookout post in the first century. The Law played host to an important event on 13 April 1689: Viscount Dundee raised the Stuart Royal Standard on the Law, which marked the beginning of the first Jacobite rising.

The Law has a railway tunnel running through it, formerly used by the line to Newtyle which closed in the 1960s. In 2014, a campaign was started to reopen it as a tourist attraction.

A memorial to the fallen of both world wars, first unveiled on 16 May 1925, stands atop the summit of the Law. Mills Observatory was proposed to be built on the Law but plans were scrapped in favour of the war memorial. Plans for the observatory moved to Balgay Hill and it eventually opened in 1935 after a series of delays.

Between 1992 and 1994, the facilities on the summit were upgraded by Dundee District Council and Scottish Enterprise Tayside, with additional funding from the regional development fund of the European Commission. The memorial is lit with a large flame at its top on a number of significant days, viz: 25 September (in memory of the Battle of Loos, in which many members of the local Black Watch regiment died), 24 October (United Nations Day), 11 November (Armistice Day), and Remembrance Sunday.

In recent times Dundee Law featured prominently in the television drama Traces.

In 2022, as part of the Dundee Summer Streets Festival, a sign inspired by the Hollywood Hills sign was erected onto the Dundee Law which spelt out "Beanotown", a reference to the fictional location featured in The Beano that is published in Dundee and was the theme of the festival. Since 2022, the Dundee Law has been a stop on the Discover Dundee tour bus.

In 2024, The Times featured the Dundee Law in a list of the best views in Scotland, ranking it fifth.

In 2025, in conjunction with the 100th anniversary of the war memorial being installed on top of the Law, new low-emission LED bulbs were installed, allowing the memorial to be lit during night hours.

== Gallery ==
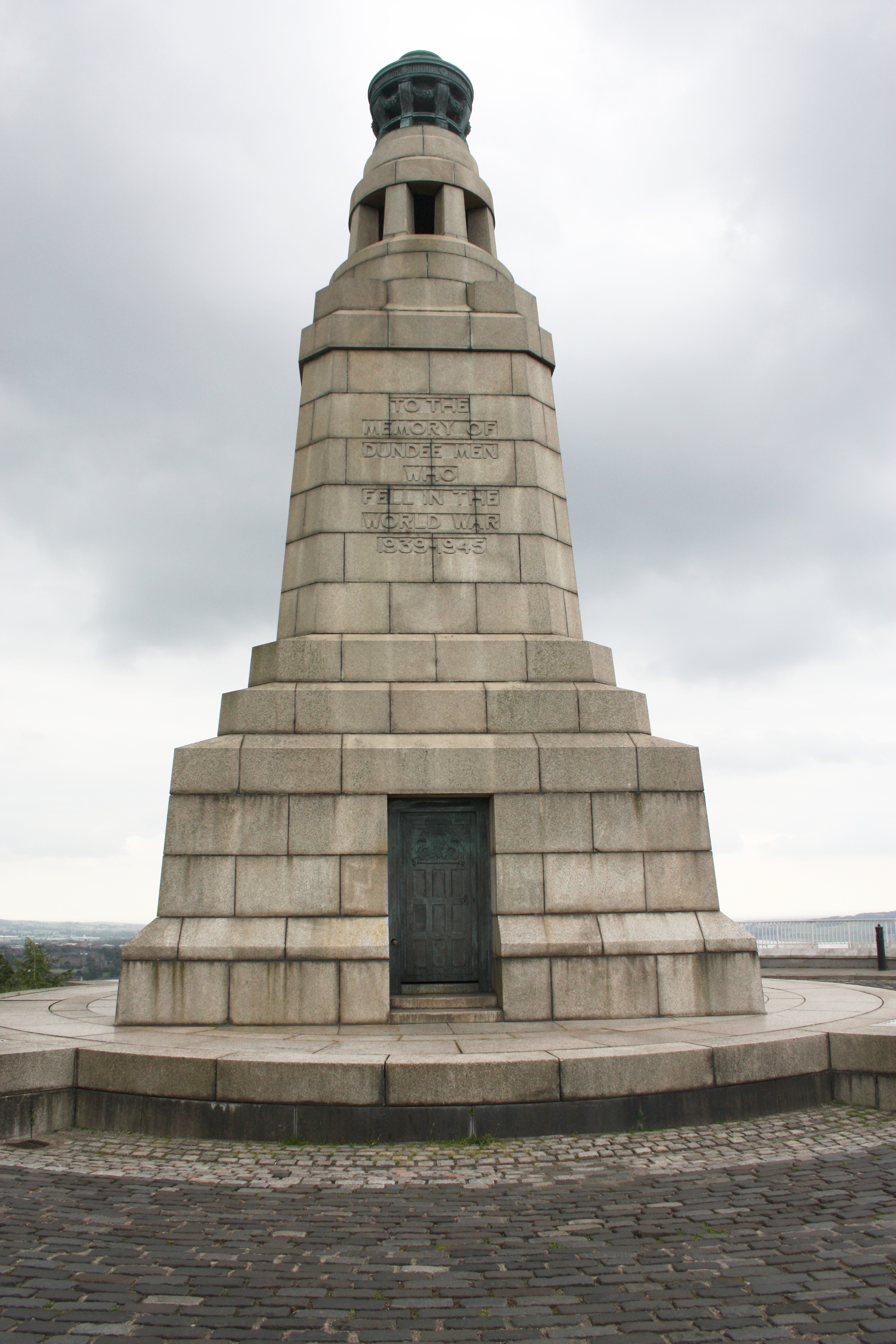
Dundee Law War Memorial

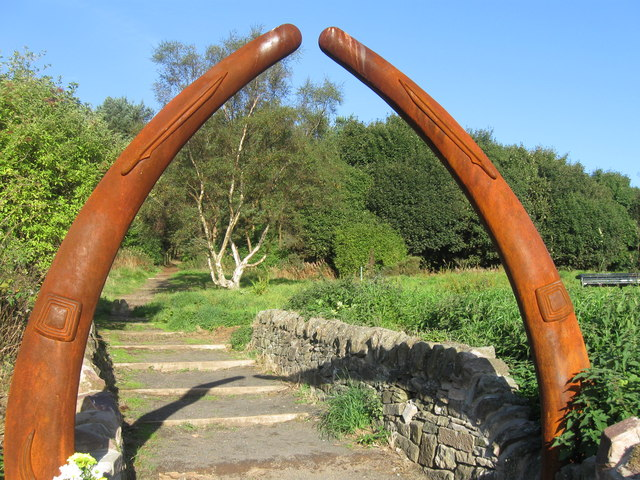
Iron Archway on the summit of the Dundee Law

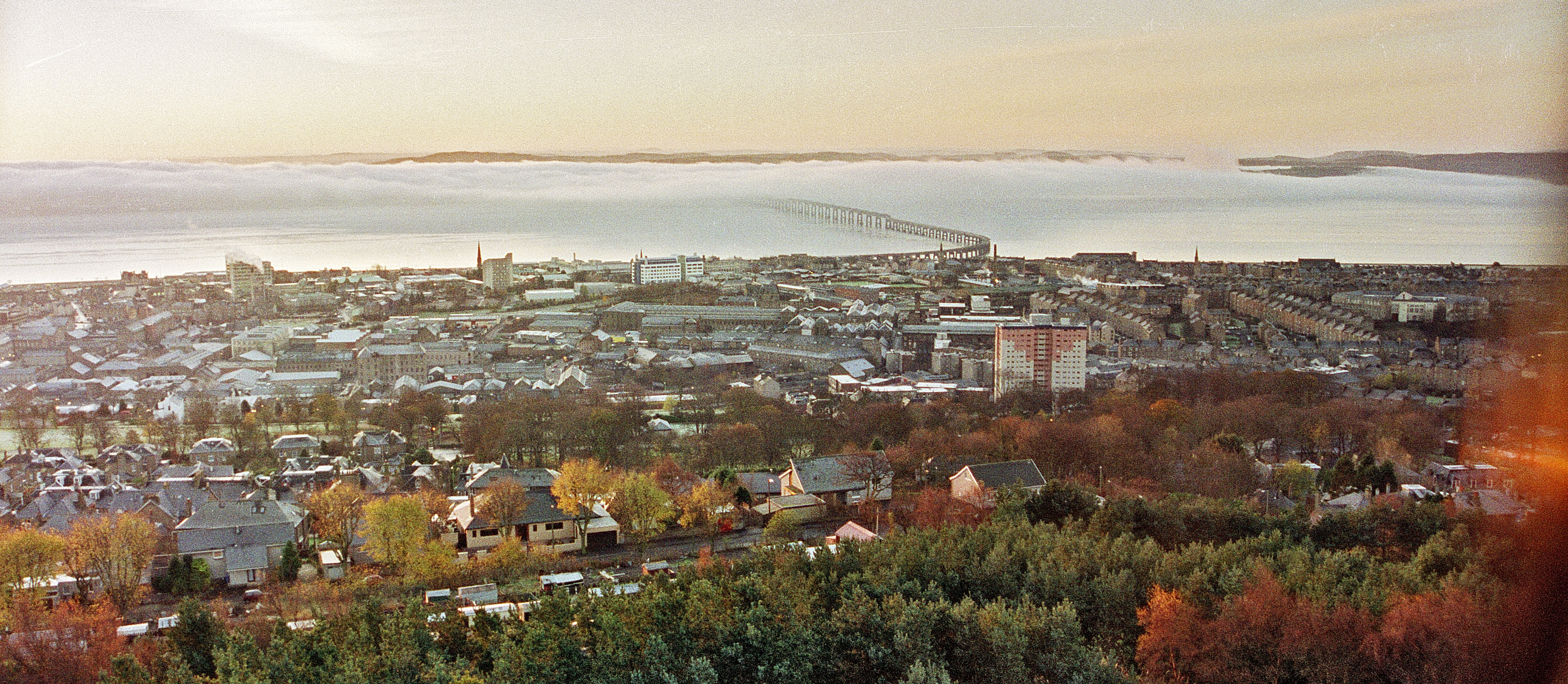
Dundee from the Dundee Law in late 1998
