= John Lauder =

John Lauder (c.1488 – after February 1560) was Scotland's Public Accuser of Heretics. He was twice sent to Rome by King James V, to confirm the loyalty of the Scottish crown. As Principal Private Secretary to Cardinal David Beaton, Archbishop of St. Andrews, he successfully prosecuted many heretics, who were burnt at the stake, John Knox testifying to his extreme cruelty. Beaton was eventually murdered by the mob, but Lauder escaped and was later Private Secretary to Archbishop Hamilton (hanged April 1571).

== Family ==
In the Great Seal of Scotland, (number 1136 dated at Edinburgh on 15 February 1532) – "the King grants Letters of legitimation for John Lauder, bastard son of Sir Robert Lauder of The Bass", knight (who died before February 1508). These Letters were subsequently confirmed by Pope Clement VII.

== Education ==
Lauder was a licentiate 'in Pedagogio' (the science of learning) at the University of St Andrews in 1508, and in a Decree Arbitral, dated at St. Andrews on 16 October 1518, he thus designates himself: "Ego sacris Apostolica et Imperiali auctoritatibus notarius, ac in officio Scriptori archivii Romane Curie matriculatus ac descriptus." He is recorded two years later as a Master of Arts.

== The Church ==
By July 1520 he was clerk in the office of the archives of the Roman Curia, and a notary. He was subsequently ordained and became at different stages of his career Archdeacon of Tweeddale, and of Teviotdale. He was Principal Private Secretary to Secretary to Cardinal David Beaton, and after him, Archbishop Hamilton. In a Feudal Charter granted by David, Cardinal Beaton dated 6 October 1539, one of the witnesses was "John Lauder, Archdeacon of Tweeddale, the Cardinal's Secretary". "John Lauder, Archdeacon of Teviotdale", had a personal armorial seal, noted from a document in 1539 as: a shield bearing arms:- 1st & 4th: Three piles (charged with as many annulets?), 2nd & 3rd: A griffin segreant contourne.

In the Treasurer's Accounts we find that he was frequently employed in ecclesiastical negotiations and in 1533 was sent to Rome "in the Kingis erandis". Letters of Pope Clement VII addressed to King James V acknowledge that John Lauder had delivered to him in the city of Marseille the King's letter (dated at Stirling 10 June 1533) together with the process raised by the bishop of Whithorn and the abbot of the monastery of Holyrood against James, Archbishop of St. Andrews. Although the cause had been committed to Laurence, Cardinal Campegio, he, nevertheless, resolved to despatch a special nuncio to Scotland to settle it, the archbishop until his arrival being detained in custody without prejudice to his spiritual jurisdiction, dated at Marseille, 31 October 1533.

King James V had sent Lauder to Rome again the following year, with a letter, dated 5 November 1534, to congratulate Pope Paul III on his election, and "to testify to James's zeal and regard for the papacy."

== Prosecutor of heretics ==
Lauder famously became Scotland's Public Accuser of Heretics.

The prosecution of Norman Gourlay (sometimes spelt Gowrlay), described as vicar of Dollar, in Perthshire and David Stratton, a brother of the Laird of Lauriston, both of whom were burnt at the stake in August 1534, was carried out by Lauder.

Patrick Fraser Tytler chronicled the trial of Thomas Forret, the martyr, in 1539. Dean Thomas Forret had also been vicar of Dollar, and a canon regular of the monastery of St. Colm's, Inch. He was tried along Duncan Simpson (a priest), two black friars – John Keillor and John Beveridge – plus a notary in Stirling by the name of Robert Forster, before a council held by Cardinal Beaton and William Chisholm, Bishop of Dunblane. Bishop Crichton of Dunkeld was also present. Lauder again prosecuted. During Forret's own defence "his Bible was plucked from his hand by Lauder, who denounced as heretical the conclusions he had drawn from it, and Forret and his four companions were condemned to the stake". The sentence was carried out on the Castle Hill of Edinburgh on the last day of February 1539.

John Knox wrote a lot about this John Lauder, and referred to him as "a monstere, full of the Popis thunder, so spytfull that the ignorant people dreded least the earth then wold have swallowed them up." Knox on Lauder is also quoted by Robert Lindsay of Pitscottie, in an almost complete transcript of the trial, on 1 March 1546, of the martyr George Wishart, whom Lauder "laidin full off curssingis written in paper.....cruellie accussit him and condemnit him to death." Cardinal Beaton presided over the execution of Wishart, with his faithful secretary and prosecutor, Lauder, at his side, in front of the Cardinal's Castle of St Andrews.

Calderwood also mentions the "Trial of Adam Wallace, 1550.........at the farther end of the chancellarie wall (in the church of the Blacke Friars in Edinburgh), in the pulpit, was placed Mr. Johne Lawder, Parson of Marbottle Morebattle [- see note above, this fell within his remit as Archdeacon of Teviotdale], accuser, cled in a surplice, and a reid hood." Foxe also gave an account of this trial.

== Other activities ==
A Papal confirmation was made by John Lauder, archdeacon of Teviotdale, and John Coldane, Provost of Methven, and John Guillermi, Provost of Seton, of a Feu Charter by Andrew, abbot of Melrose, to Arthur Sinclare of the lands of Lessuden except the lands of Newtoun, Earlston, Maxpeffill, Cammestoun and Plewland, with the mill of Newtoun and thirlage of Newtoun, Lessuden, Earlston, Cammestone, Maxpeffill, Murehouslaw and Plewland except the fishings on the Tuede (Tweed) belonging to said lands of Lessuden, dated 26 February 1541.

In 1541 Lauder, Archdeacon of Teviotdale, paid the third rental for the parsonage and vicarage of Morebattle, in Roxburghshire, amounting to £73/15/7. It is mentioned that this formed the prebend of the Archdeacon of Teviotdale, which post was held by Lauder from 1534 to 1551. His successor was John Hepburn, later Bishop of Brechin, who held the post from 1544 to 1564.

On 5 January 1542 we find him as "the Cardinal's Secretary" representing Cardinal David Beaton at the reconsecration of the restored and ancient St Baldred's chapel on The Bass, his father's stronghold.

An instrument upon the receipt by Robert Lawder of Bass of £80 Scots in redemption of the lands of Kylpallet, constabulary of Haddington and shire of Edinburgh, wadset to him by John Lord Hay of Yester; Done at the instance of the said Lord's procurator, Mr. Thomas Hay, provost of Bothanis Abbey St Bathans, place of Biel, 2 p.m., 21 March 1542. Witnesses: John Lawder, natural son of the laird of Bass, John Lawder in Stenton and Thomas Wait. John Manderstoun is the notary public. (Seal of Robert Lauder appended in fair condition.)

"John Lauder, Archdeacon of Teviotdale, Cardinal's Secretary", is a witness to a charter by David Betoun, Cardinal Archbishop of St. Andrews, dated there 15 March 1545/6. This charter gives a lot of detail on the family of the Cardinal.

Master John Lauder was one of the auditors of the Chamberlain's Accounts for the Archbishopric of St. Andrews from 1540 to 1549, wherein he is styled Archdeacon of Teviotdale.

Cardinal Beaton was himself finally murdered by a mob of reformists not long after Wishart's execution, and subsequently Lauder is noted in February 1551 and in March 1560 as a Notary Public of St. Andrews "by Apostolic authority" and "Secretarius" to Archbishop Hamilton, Beaton's successor, who was also later hanged on 6 April 1571.

Lauder's fate is unknown.
