= Hellen Stirk =

Scottish Protestant martyr (died 1544)

- Died: 27 January 1544; Perth
- Cause of death: Forced drowning
- Known for: Execution for blasphemy

Hellen Stirk or Helene Stirk or Helen Stark (died 27 January 1544) was one of the Perth Martyrs, a group of Scots executed for their Protestant beliefs in Perth in the period immediately before the Scottish Reformation. She was convicted of blasphemy and executed by drowning in (or close to) the River Tay. Her offence was a failure to cry out to the Virgin Mary during the rigours of childbirth.

== Life ==
Hellen Stirk was married to James Ranaldsone, a skinner burgess of Perth, another of the convicted Perth Martyrs. The couple had one son and two daughters.

== Accusation of blasphemy ==
The specific charge against Hellen Stirk was that, despite persuasion, she had refused to call upon the Virgin Mary to ease her recent childbirth, instead calling only to God. In doing so, Stirk was deemed to have judged the Virgin Mary without merit, and that Mary should not be "preferred before other women".

== Death ==
After her conviction, Stirk asked to be executed beside the other martyrs; the authorities refused her request. Instead, she was taken to the River Tay, where she was forcibly drowned in either the river itself or a pool nearby.

== See also ==
- List of Protestant martyrs of the Scottish Reformation
