= Clan Straiton =

Lowland Scottish clan

- Motto: Surgere Tento (I strive to rise)
- Clan Straiton no longer has a chief, and is an armigerous clan
- Historic seat: Lauriston Castle

Clan Straiton, also called Straton or Stratton, is a Lowland Scottish clan. The clan does not currently have a chief therefore it is considered an Armigerous clan.

== History ==
=== Origins of the clan ===
The barony of Straiton is in the county of Midlothian on the outskirts of the city of Edinburgh. There are also baronies of a similar name in Ayrshire and in Fife. The historian Alexander Nisbet said that the family received their lands of Straiton from David I of Scotland. Alexander Straiton of that Ilk and Andrew Straiton of Craig served on the inquest for Sir Alexander Fraser of Pilforth to succeed to the estates of his grandfather.

=== Wars of Scottish Independence ===
In 1296, Thomas de Straton appeared on the Ragman Rolls. Alexander de Straton was one of the signatories to the Declaration of Arbroath in 1320. The historian George Fraser Black has suggested that he may be the same Alexander de Straton who is described as of our blood in a charter by David II of Scotland to him. In 1351, John de Stratton dominus ejusdem (of that Ilk) witnessed a charter of lands.

=== 15th century ===
In 1411, Alexander Straiton, or Stratton, was killed at the Battle of Harlaw. The Clan Straiton also held lands in Aberdeenshire and near Inverness. In 1451, Cristina de Stratone granted a charter in favour of the Friars Preachers in Aberdeen.

Alexander Sutherland of Dunbeath, second son of Robert Sutherland, 6th Earl of Sutherland (died 1444), mentioned several times in his testament Alexander Stratoun of Lauriston who he described as his "sister sone" and who had married into the Earl of Sutherland's family. John Sutherland, 7th Earl of Sutherland is found granting to his kinsman, Alexander Sutherland, 3rd of Duffus, a charter for the lands of Torboll and the grant was witnessed by several Scottish gentlemen including Alexander Straton of Lauriston.

== Castles ==
- Straiton, which was four and a half miles south of Edinburgh Castle was held by the clan from the thirteenth century or earlier. There was a hall house although there are no longer any remains of it. The Strattons were still in possession of it in the middle of the fifteenth century.
- Lauriston Castle which is four miles to the south of Laurencekirk, Kincardineshire was originally held by the Clan Stirling but was held by the Strattons from the thirteenth century until 1695.
- Kirkside, which is three miles north of Montrose, Angus is a substantial 18th century mansion that incorporates older work, that was held by the Strattons from 1582 to 1872.
- Seabegs, which is to the south-east of Bonnybridge, West Lothian was held by the Strattons in the twelfth century and there are the remains of a Motte.

== Clan Profile ==
- Arms: Argent, three bars counter embattled Azure.
- Crest: A falcon rising Proper
- Motto: Surgere tento (I strive to rise)
- Supporters: Dexter, a lion rampant Or; sinister, a bloodhound Sable

== See also ==
- Scottish clan
- Armigerous clan
