= Forrest Thomas =

Forrest Thomas is the name of:

- Forrest (singer) (1953–2013), American pop singer, based in the Netherlands
- Frosty Thomas (1881–1970), baseball player
- Thomas Forrest Cumming (1842–1918), Australian sheep breeder and Legislative Council for Western Province

== See also ==
- Forest Yeo-Thomas
- Thomas Forrest (disambiguation)
