= Alexander Ales =

Scottish theologian (1500–1556)

- Born: Alexander Alane; 23 April 1500; Edinburgh, Scotland
- Died: 17 March 1565 (aged 64); Leipzig, Electorate of Saxony
- Occupation: Theologian

Alexander Ales or Alexander Alesius (/əˈliːsiəs/; born Alexander Alane; 23 April 1500 – 17 March 1565) was a Scottish theologian who emigrated to Germany and became a Lutheran supporter of the Augsburg Confession.

== Life ==
Originally Alexander Alane, he was born at Edinburgh. He studied at St Andrews in the newly founded college of St Leonard's, where he graduated in 1515. Some time afterwards he was appointed a priest at the University's church, where he preached vigorously in favor of scholastic theology, Renaissance humanism, and anti-Protestantism. His views entirely changed, however, upon witnessing the 1528 execution by burning of Rev. Patrick Hamilton, a Lutheran Pastor and former abbot of Fern. Fr. Ales was chosen to meet Hamilton in a theological debate, with a view to convincing him of the errors of Lutheranism, but the theological arguments of the Scottish minister and, above all, his fortitude at the stake impressed Alesius so powerfully that he immediately embraced Lutheran theology.

A sermon he preached before the Synod at St Andrews against the dissoluteness of the clergy offended the provost, who placed him in prison, and might have carried his resentment further if Alesius had not escaped to Germany in 1532. After travelling through northern Europe, he settled down at Wittenberg, where he befriended Martin Luther and Philipp Melanchthon and signed the Augsburg confession. Meanwhile, he was tried by the Bishops of the Catholic Church in Scotland for heresy and condemned to death in absentia. In 1533 a decree by the Scottish Bishops, prohibiting the reading of the New Testament by the laity, drew from Alesius a defence of the right of the people, in the form of an open letter to King James V of Scotland.

A reply to this by German Roman Catholic priest and Renaissance humanist Johann Cochlaeus was also addressed to the Scottish king and occasioned a second letter from Alesius, in which he amplified his argument with greater force and entered into more general questions. In August 1534 he and a few others were excommunicated at Holyrood by the deputy of the Archbishop of St Andrews. When King Henry VIII (1509–47) declared himself Supreme Head of the Church of England, Alesius was persuaded to go to England, where he was cordially received (August 1535) by the king and his pro-Protestant advisers, Archbishop Thomas Cranmer and Thomas Cromwell. He briefly attended the court of Henry's queen, Anne Boleyn, of whom he thought very highly and he was actually in London during her downfall, trial, and execution by beheading, although it was Alesius' belief that Boleyn was not guilty of adultery or any of the other crimes for she was put to death. Later, during the reign of Queen Elizabeth I, Anne Boleyn's daughter, Alesius wrote a letter to the new Queen detailing his memories of her mother.

After a short stay at Lambeth Palace he was appointed, through the influence of Cromwell, then chancellor of the university, to lecture on theology at the Queens' College, Cambridge; but when he had delivered a few expositions of the Hebrew psalms, he was prevented from continuing by the anti-Protestant party.

Returning to London he supported himself for some time by practising as a physician. In 1537 he attended a convocation of the clergy, and at the request of Cromwell Alesius debated with John Stokesley, Bishop of London, on the nature of the sacraments. His argument was published in 1544 under the title Of the auctorite of the word of god agaynst the bisshop of london wherein are conteyned certen disputacyons had in the parliament howse betwene the bisshops a bowt the nomber of the sacramen[n]ts and other things, very necessary to be known, made by Alexa[n]der Alane Scot and sent to the duke of Saxon.

In 1539 Alesius was compelled to flee for a second time to Germany, as a result of Thomas Cromwell's fall from the King's favour and the enactment of the statute of the Six Articles. He was appointed to a theological chair at the university of Frankfurt an der Oder, where he was the first professor to teach Lutheran theology. He was in England again for a short time during Edward VI's reign, and was commissioned by Cranmer to make a Latin translation of the First Prayer-Book (1549) for the use of Martin Bucer, whose opinion was desired.

Returning to Leipzig he passed the remainder of his days in peace and honour, and was twice elected Rector of the University.

== Works ==
His writings were both exegetical and controversial, but chiefly the latter. They include Expositio Libri Psalmorum Davidis (1550). His controversial works refer to such subjects as the translation of the Bible into the vernacular, against Servetus, etc.

Alesius published a large number of exegetical, dogmatic and polemical works, of which over twenty are mentioned by Bale in his List of English Writers. In his controversial works he upholds the synergistic views of the Scottish theologian John Major. He displayed his interest in his native land by the publication of a Cohortatio ad Concordiam Pietatis, missa in Patriam suam (1544), which had the express approval of Luther, and a Cohortatio ad Pietatis Concordiam ineundam (1559).
