= Perth Martyrs =

The Perth Martyrs were six people executed in Perth, Scotland, in 1543 for their Protestant beliefs. The condemned people were William Anderson, James Finlayson, James Hunter, Robert Lamb, James Raveleson and Helen Stark. They were sentenced to death for their beliefs, after being convicted by the Archbishop of St Andrews. Anderson, Finlayson, Hunter and Lamb were sentenced to be hanged, Raveleson was to be burnt; and Helen Stark, "with her sucking infant," was to be put into a sack and drowned. Their story is recorded in Foxe's Book of Martyrs, in Calderwood's History of the Kirk of Scotland and in James Anthony Froude's History of England.

== See also ==
- List of Protestant martyrs of the Scottish Reformation
