= Thomas Forrest (translator) =

English translator (fl. 1580)

Thomas Forrest (fl. 1580) was an English author and translator. He translated three orations of Isocrates in A Perfite Looking Glasse for all Estates, imprinted at London by Thomas Purfoote in 1580.

== Works ==
Thomas Forrest was author of A Perfite Looking Glasse for all Estates: most excellently and eloquently set forth by the famous and learned Oratour Isocrates, as contained in three Orations of Morall Instructions, written in the Greeke tongue, of late yeeres: Translated into Latine by … Hieronimus Wolfius. And nowe Englished … with sundrie examples of pithy sentences, both of Princes and Philosophers, gathered and collected out of divers writers, Coted in the margent, approbating the Author's intent. … Imprinted in Newgate Market, within the new Rents, at the Signe of the Lucrece, 1580. The volume is a quarto of forty-six leaves, and is dedicated by the translator, Tho. Forrest, to Sir Thomas Bromley. There are also prefixed:

- "An Epistle to the Reader";
- "The Author's Enchomion upon Sir Thomas Bromley";
- "J. D. in Commendation of the Author";
- "In Praise of the Author, S. Norreis";
- "The Booke to the Reader".

The volume is probably 'certen orations of Isocrates' found in the Stationers' Register under date 4 January 1580. Ritson puts Forrest among the English poets because of the "Enchomion" above mentioned.

== Sources ==
- Ritson, Joseph (1802). Bibliographia Poetica: A Catalogue of Engleish Poets. London: C. Roworth, for G. and W. Nicol. p. 209.
- Botley, P. (2004). "Forrest, Thomas (fl. 1580), translator". Oxford Dictionary of National Biography (online ed.). Oxford University Press. doi:10.1093/ref:odnb/9890. (Subscription, Wikipedia Library access or UK public library membership required.)
- Forrest, Thomas (1580). A Perfite Looking Glasse for all Estates. London: Thomas Purfoote.

Attribution:

- This article incorporates text from a publication now in the public domain: Bayne, Ronald (1889). "Forrest, Thomas (fl.1580)". In Stephen, Leslie (ed.). Dictionary of National Biography. Vol. 20. London: Smith, Elder & Co. p. 3.
