= Scottish Castles Association =

Scottish castles conservation charity

- Formation: 1996 (Charity from 1999)
- Legal status: Charity registered in Scotland (No. SC029654)
- Purpose: Encourage the protection, restoration, understanding and use of Scotland's castles
- Members: Open
- Patron: The Rt Hon the Lord Steel of Aikwood KT KBE PC
- President: Professor Richard Oram
- Chair: Lady Lauriston (Dorothy Newlands of Lauriston)
- Website: http://www.scotlandscastles.org

The Scottish Castles Association is an independent charity that encourages the protection, preservation, restoration, research, study and appreciation of Scottish castles, tower houses and manor houses and their furnishings, settings, gardens and designed landscapes.

The Scottish Castles Association shares expertise and resources through study tours and other events, publications, forums and an online archive. It also presents awards to recognise outstanding contributions to the understanding, preservation and promotion of Scotland’s castles. Awards include the Nigel Tranter Memorial Award, established to honour the founding President of the Association, historian and writer Nigel Tranter, and the Charles McKean Memorial Prize, awarded to students in memory of architectural historian and former Association President, Professor Charles McKean.

The Scottish Castles Association was founded in 1996 to stimulate interest in the conservation and restoration of Scotland’s castles, and became a charity in 1999. It is registered in Scotland (Charity No. SC029654).
