= George Wishart =

16th-century Protestant martyr

The Reverend George Wishart
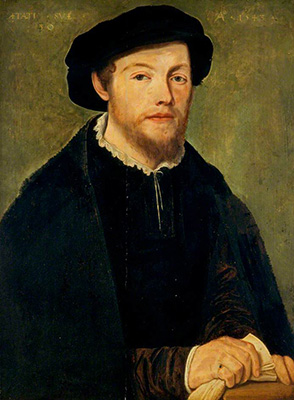
- Born: c. 1513; Kincardineshire, Scotland
- Died: 1 March 1546 (aged 32–33); St Andrews, Scotland
- Education: University of Aberdeen; University of Leuven; Corpus Christi College, Cambridge
- Occupation: Preacher

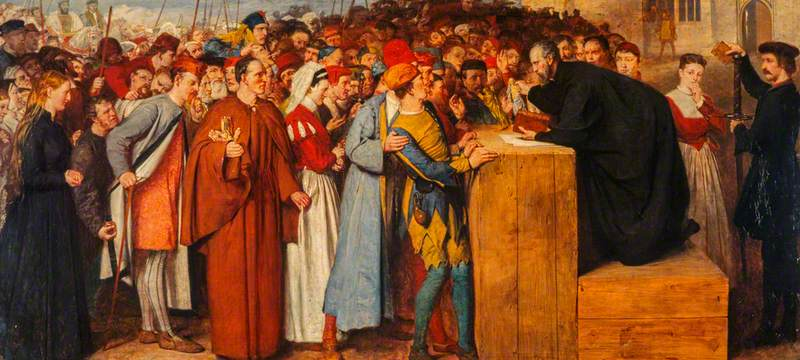
Wishart preaching against Mariolatry

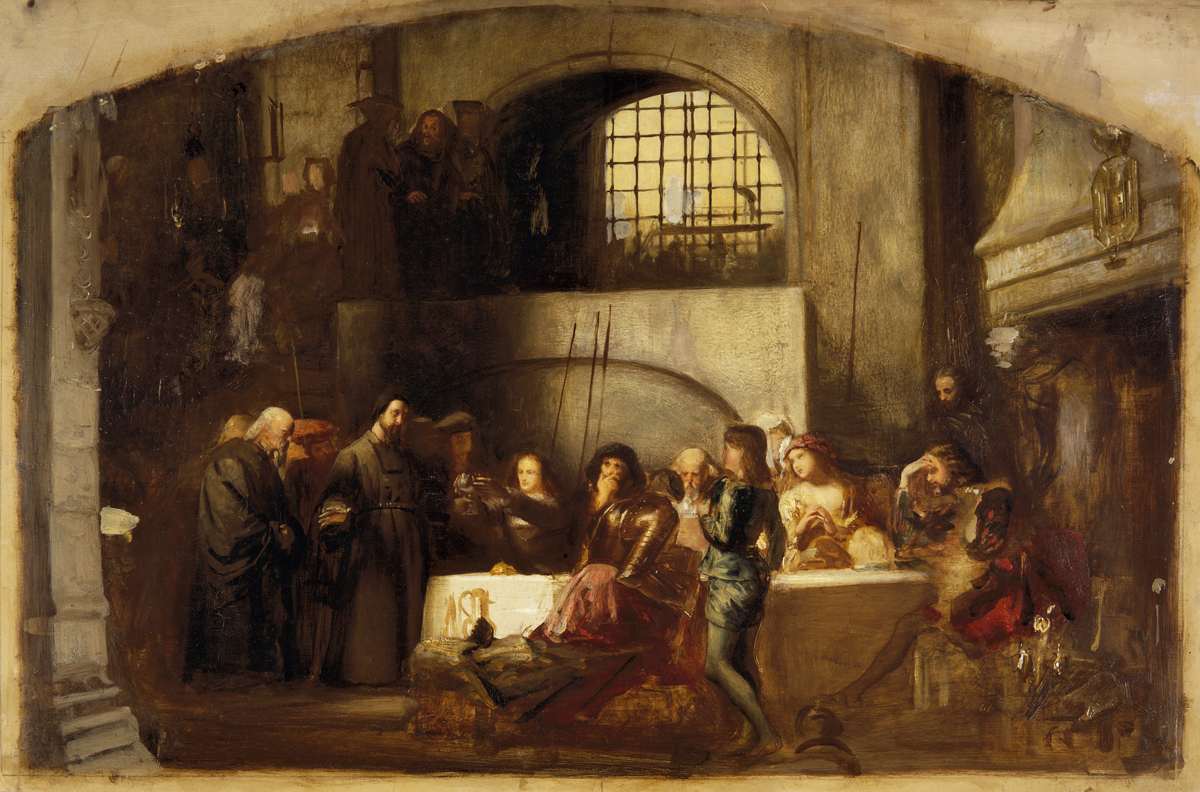
George Wishart's last communion

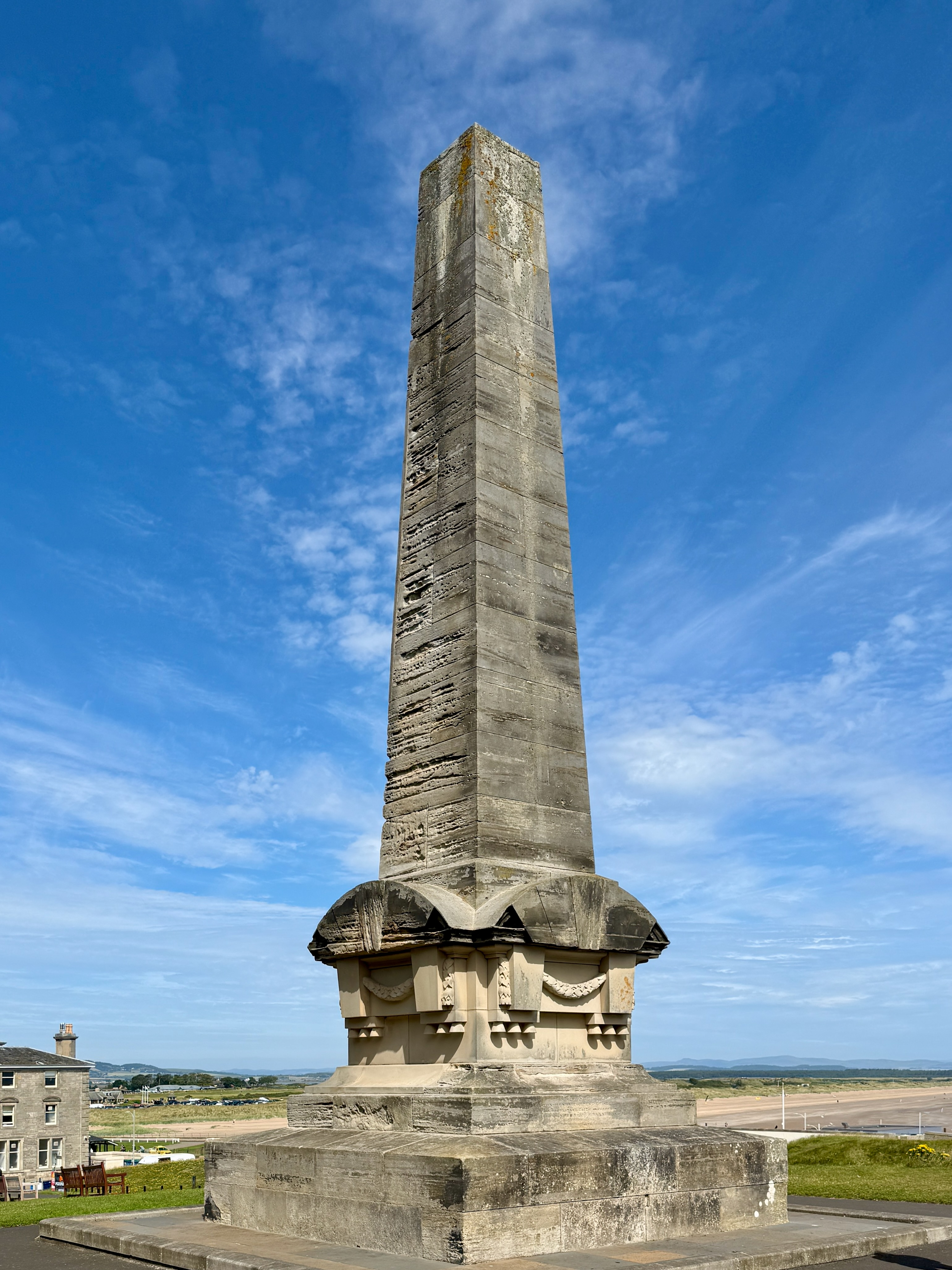
The Martyrs' Monument, St Andrews, which commemorates Wishart and three other martyrs: Patrick Hamilton, Henry Forrest, and Walter Milne

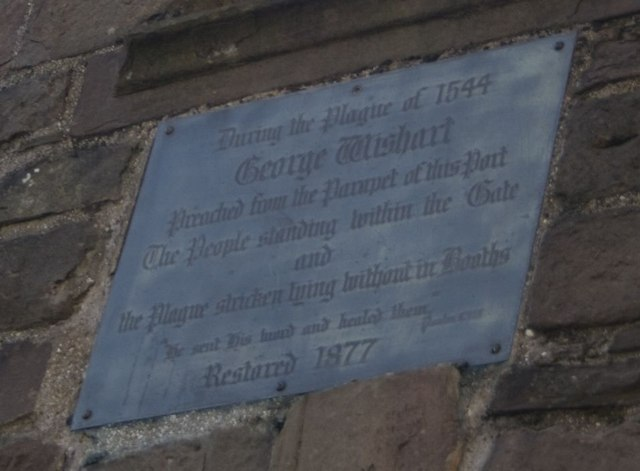
Plaque on the Wishart Arch, Dundee

George Wishart (also Wisehart; c. 1513 – 1 March 1546) was a Scottish Protestant Reformer and one of the early Protestant martyrs burned at the stake as a heretic.

George Wishart was the son of James and brother of Sir John of Pitarrow, both ranking themselves on the side of the Reformers. He was educated at the University of Aberdeen, then recently founded, and travelled afterwards on the Continent. It is thought that it was while he was abroad that he first turned attention to the study of the Reformed doctrines. He engaged for some time in teaching Greek at Montrose. Wishart afterwards proceeded to Cambridge and resided there for about six years, from 1538 to 1543. He returned to Scotland in the train of the Commissioners who had been appointed to arrange a marriage between Prince Edward and the Queen of Scots. He preached to the people with much acceptance at Montrose, Dundee, and throughout Ayrshire. On passing East to the Lothians, Wishart, who spoke latterly as in near prospect of death, was apprehended by Bothwell in the house of Cockburn, of Ormiston. He was carried captive to St Andrews, where he was tried by a clerical Assembly, found guilty, and condemned as an obstinate heretic. The following day he was executed at the stake on Castle Green, his persecutor, Cardinal David Beaton or Bethune, looking on the scene from the windows of the castle, where he himself would be assassinated within three months.

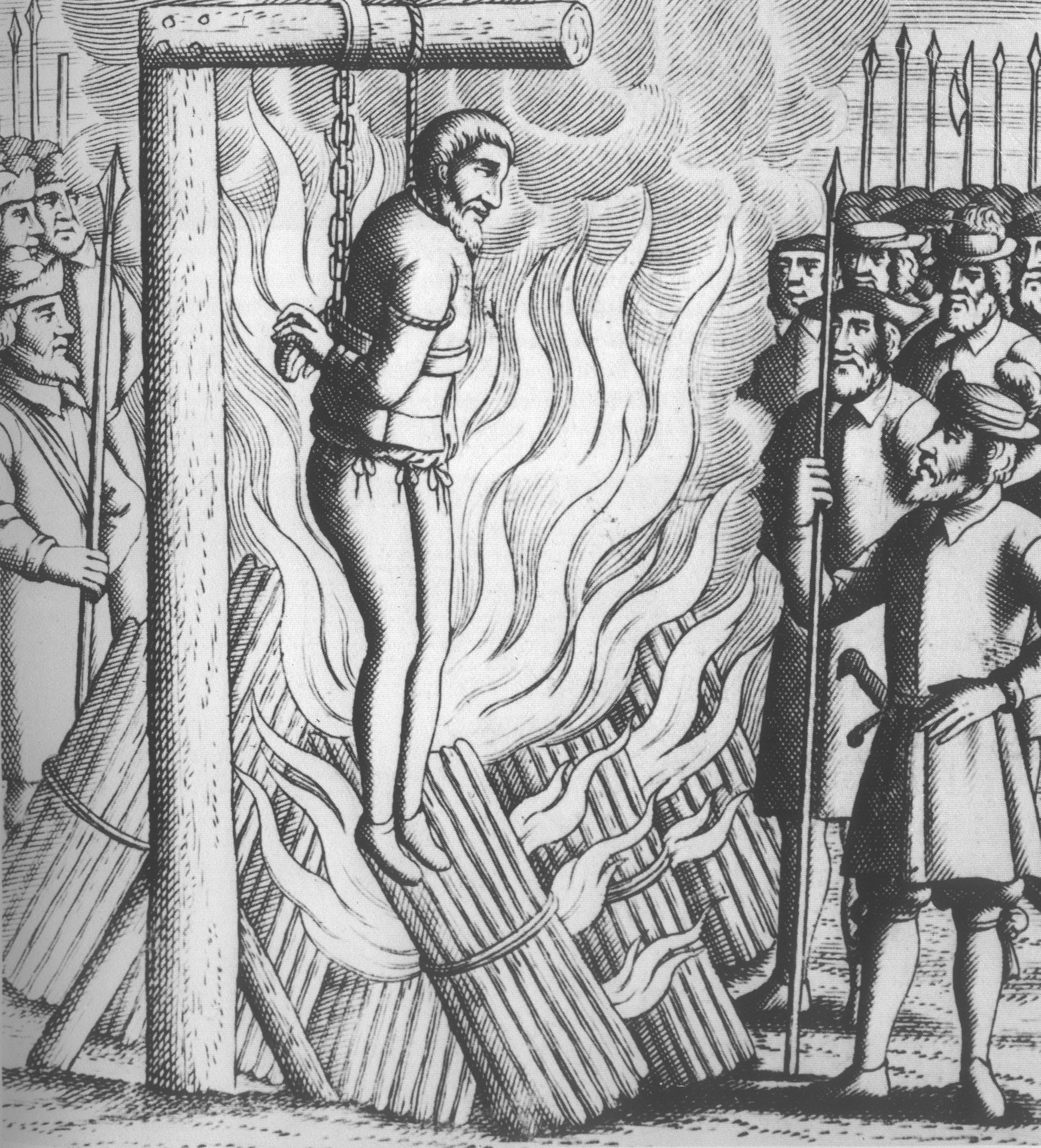
A woodcut portraying the martyrdom of Wishart

== Life ==
He belonged to a younger branch of the Wisharts of Pitarrow near Fordoun, Kincardineshire. His mother Elizabeth, sister of Sir James Learmonth, married James Wishart of Pitarrow in April 1512. He was probably called George after his maternal grandfather or granduncle Prior George Leirmont. The name was certainly derived from his mother's family. George's father, James Wishart, died in May 1525, therefore, his mother, Elizabeth together with her brother, Sir James Learmonth of Balcomie, were the two people who were responsible for George's upbringing. Some have suggested that he may have graduated M.A., probably at King's College, Aberdeen, though others, including Wishart biographer Rev. Charles Rogers says that his name does not occur on the records of any Scottish college. He was certainly a student at the University of Leuven, from which he graduated in 1531. Around this time he translated the First Helvetic Confession into English from the Latin. He taught the New Testament in Greek as schoolmaster at Montrose in Angus, until investigated for heresy by the Bishop of Brechin in 1538. He fled to England, where a similar charge was brought against him at Bristol in the following year by Thomas Cromwell. Under examination by Archbishop Thomas Cranmer he recanted some utterances. In 1539 or 1540 he may have visited Germany and Switzerland, but by 1542 he had entered Corpus Christi College, Cambridge, where he studied and taught.

In 1543 he returned to Scotland, in the train of a Scottish embassy which had come to London to consider the treaty of marriage between Prince Edward (later Edward VI) and the infant Mary, Queen of Scots. He returned to Montrose, where again he taught Scripture.

He may have been the "Scottish man called Wishart" acting as a messenger to England for Alexander Crichton of Brunstane in a 1544 plot against Cardinal David Beaton. Some historians such as Alphons Bellesheim and Richard Watson Dixon have accepted this identification; others are sceptical. Other possibilities include a George Wishart, Baillie of Dundee, who allied himself with Beaton's murderers; and Sir John Wishart (died 1576), afterwards a Scottish judge.

His career as an itinerant preacher began in 1544, from when he traveled Scotland from east to west. The story has been told by his disciple John Knox. He went from place to place, in danger of his life, denouncing the errors of the Papacy and the abuses in the churches of Montrose, Dundee (where he escaped an attempt on his life), Ayr, Perth, Edinburgh, Leith, Haddington (where Knox accompanied him) and elsewhere.

At Ormiston in East Lothian, in January 1546, he was seized by Lord Bothwell on the orders of Cardinal Beaton, taken to Elphinstone Castle, and transferred by order of the privy council to Edinburgh castle on 19 January 1546. Thence he was handed over to Beaton, who had a "show trial", with John Lauder prosecuting Wishart. He was hanged on a gibbet and his body burned at St Andrews on 1 March 1546. Foxe and Knox attribute to him a prophecy of the death of the Cardinal, who was assassinated on 29 May following, partly in revenge for Wishart's death.

Wishart's preaching in 1544–45 helped popularise the teachings of Calvin and Zwingli in Scotland. He translated into English the first Helvetic Confession of Faith in 1536. At his trial he refused to accept that confession was a sacrament, denied free will, recognised the priesthood of all believing Christians, and rejected the notion that the infinite God could be "comprehended in one place" between "the priest's hands". He proclaimed that the true Church was where the Word of God was faithfully preached and the two dominical sacraments rightly administered.

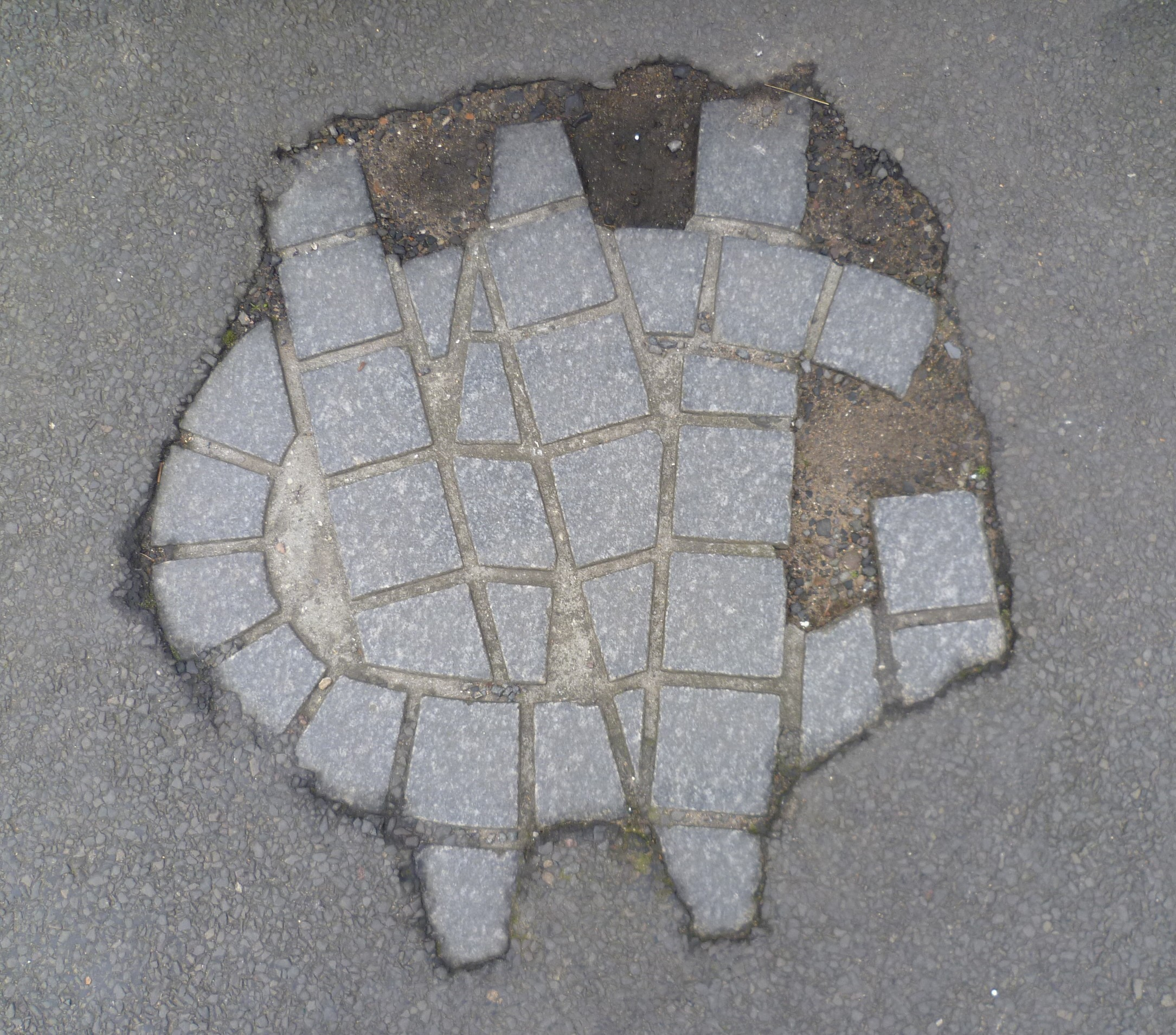
Wishart's initials at the site of his execution

== Memorials ==
The Martyrs Memorial at St Andrews was erected to the honour of George Wishart, Patrick Hamilton, and other martyrs of the Reformation era.

Dundee's East Port (also known as Cowgate Port), the remains of a gateway in the town's walls, is known as the Wishart Arch. The Arch is the only surviving portion of the town's walls, and probably survived owing to a story that George Wishart preached from it in 1544 to plague victims. However the connection of the Arch with Wishart has been described as 'probably-mythical' and the structure is thought to have been built around 1590, long after Wishart's death. Wishart was also commemorated in Dundee with a United Presbyterian church being named after him. Wishart church was built in Dundee' Cowgate in 1841 and could seat over 700 people. It was this church that the missionary Mary Slessor was a member of when she lived in Dundee. It was renamed Wishart Memorial Church in 1901, a year after it had become part of the United Free Church of Scotland, and 1929 became part of the Church of Scotland. In 1975 the church congregation was united with Dundee church and the building was sold to Dundee Cyrenians who turned it into a hostel for people with alcohol problems called the Wishart Centre. There is a house at Saint Kentigern College in Auckland, New Zealand, named after him. A lodge of the Scottish Orange Order, formed with a warrant in Dundee but often meeting in nearby Forfar, is named The Wishart Arch Defenders in his honour.

== See also ==
- Patrick Hamilton (martyr)
- John Ogilvie (saint)
- List of Protestant martyrs of the Scottish Reformation
