= Walter Milne =

Walter Milne or Mill or Myln or Mylne
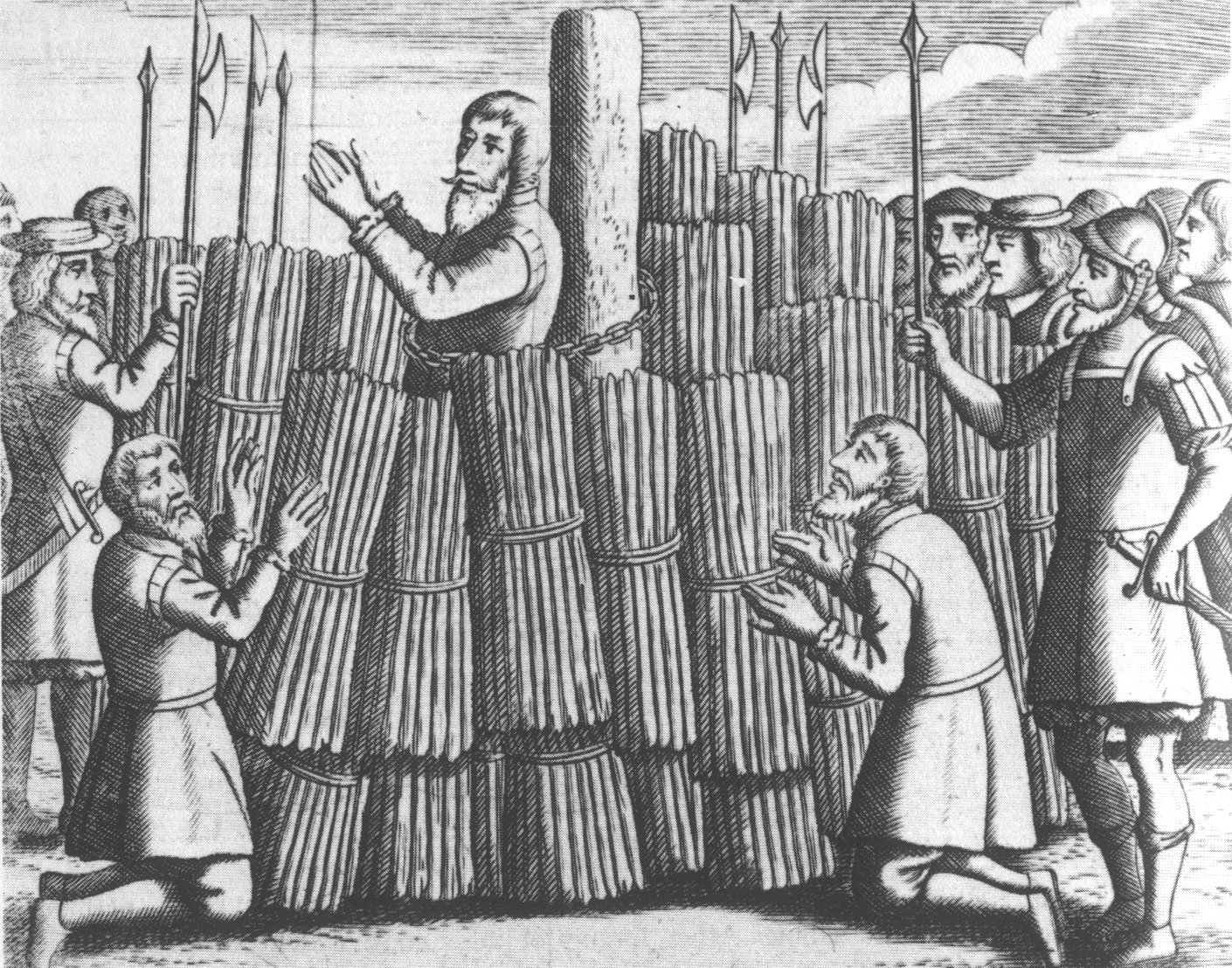
- Woodcut of Milne's martyrdom

Personal details
- Born: c. 1476
- Died: 28 April 1558 St. Andrews
- Denomination: Christian

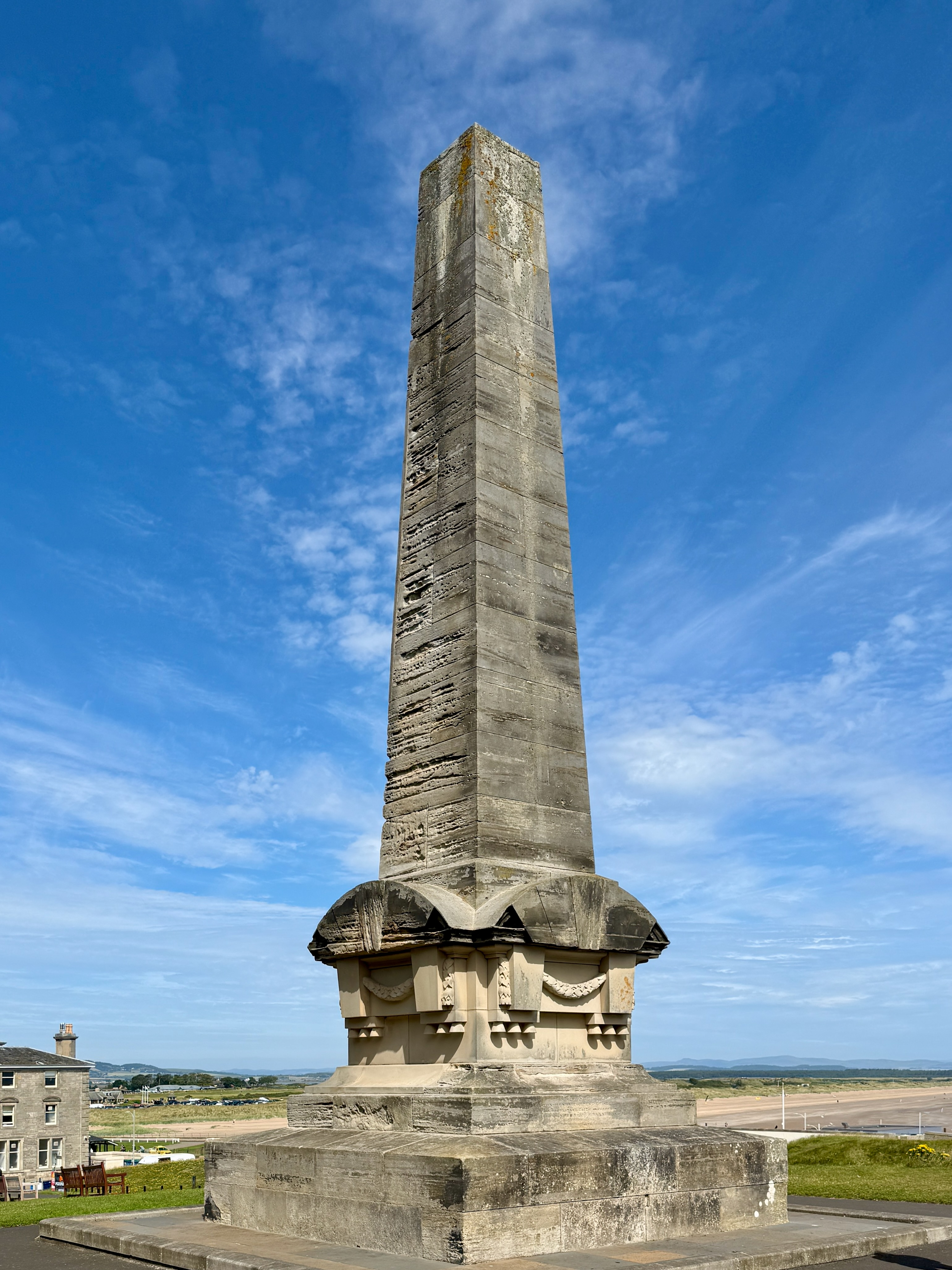
The Martyrs' Monument, St Andrews, which commemorates Milne and three other martyrs: Patrick Hamilton, Henry Forrest, and George Wishart.

Walter Milne (died April 1558), also recorded as Mill or Myln, was the last Protestant martyr to be burned in Scotland before the Scottish Reformation changed the country from Catholic to Presbyterian.

== Early life ==
In his early years he visited Germany, where he imbibed the doctrines of the Reformation. At one point he was Roman Catholic priest of the Parish of Lunan near Montrose. During the time of Cardinal Beaton information was laid against him as a heretic, whereupon he fled the country, and was condemned to be burnt wherever he might be found.

== Arrest and trial ==
Long after the cardinal's death he was at the instance of John Hamilton, archbishop of St. Andrews, apprehended on 20 April 1558 in the town of Dysart, Fife. He 'was warmand him in ane poor wyfes hous, and was teaching her the commandments of God'. After being for some time confined in the castle of St. Andrews, he was brought for trial before an assemblage of bishops, abbots, and doctors in the cathedral church. He was then over eighty years of age, and so weak and infirm that he could scarce climb up to the pulpit where he had to answer before them. Yet, says Foxe, 'when he began to speak he made the church to ring and sound again with so great courage and stoutness that the Christians which were present were no less rejoiced than the adversaries were confounded and ashamed.' So far from pretending to deny the accusations against him, he made use of the opportunity boldly to denounce what he regarded as the special errors of the Romish church; his trial was soon over, and he was condemned to be burnt as a heretic on 28 April 1558. When he was sentenced to death, Milne replied "I will not recant the truth. I am corn, not chaff; I will not be blown away with the wind or burst by the flail. I will survive both."

== Execution ==
He was burned at the stake for heresy outside Deans Court, St Andrews, in April 1558 at the age of 82. According to George Buchanan, the commonalty of St. Andrews were so offended at the sentence that they shut up their shops in order that they might sell no materials for his execution; and after his death they heaped up in his memory a great pile of stones on the place where he was burned.

== Subsequent events ==
Mylne was married, and his widow was alive in 1573, when she received 6l. 13s. 4d. out of the thirds of the benefices. After John Knox preached in June 1559 in St. Andrews his famous sermon on "cleansing of the temple" that began the Scottish reformation, "by order of the magistrates the churches were stripped of the monuments of 'idolatry' which were ceremoniously burned on the spot where Myln had suffered." Milne is commemorated on the Martyrs' Monument at St Andrews and on a window in Edinburgh Castle.

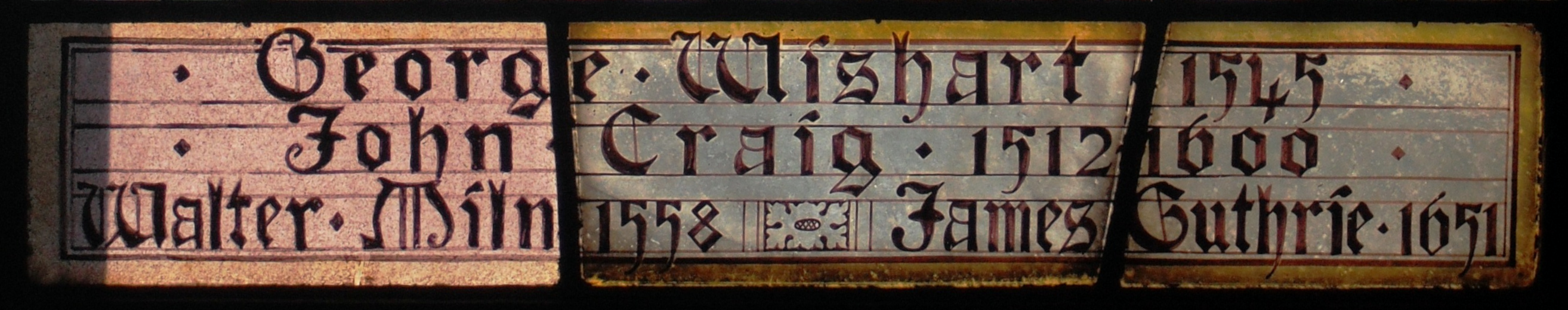
Window in Edinburgh Castle's Great Hall. George Wishart (c.1513 – 1 Mar 1546), John Craig (1512-1600), James Guthrie (1612? – 1 Jun 1661)

== See also ==
List of Protestant martyrs of the Scottish Reformation
