= Patrick Hamilton (martyr) =

Scottish clergyman

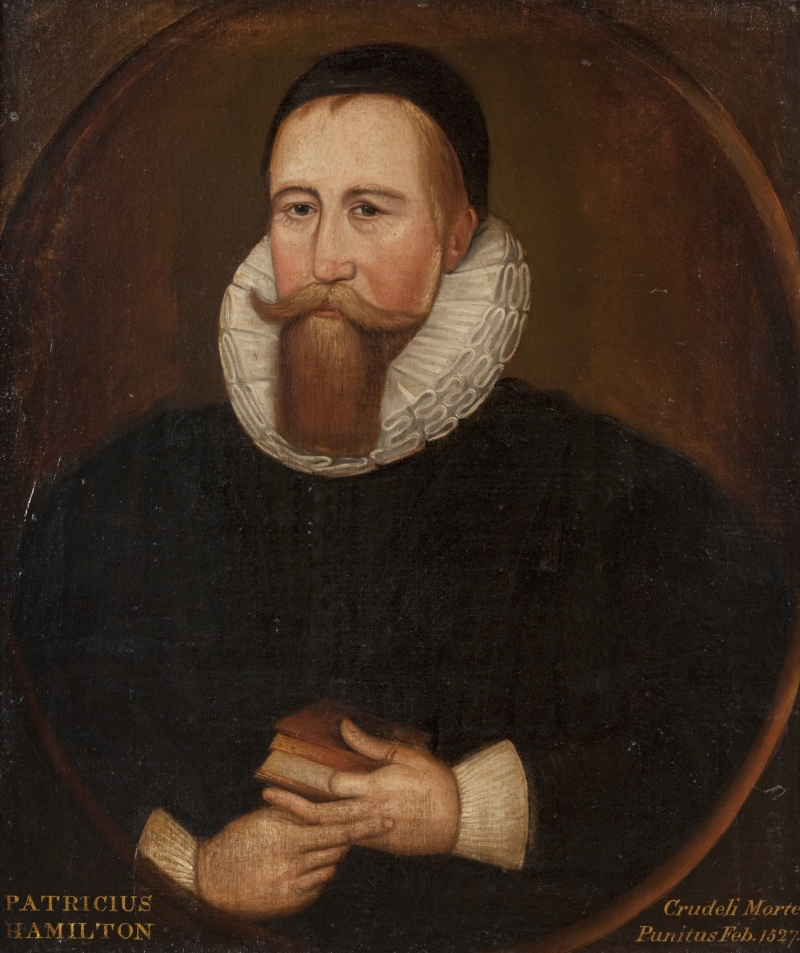
- Patrick Hamilton by John Scougal, c. 1645-1730. This is the only known portrait of the martyr.
- Born: c. 1504
- Died: 29 February 1528
- Occupations: Churchman and Reformer
- Parents: Sir Patrick Hamilton of Kincavil (father); Margaret Stewart (mother)
- Relatives: Sister, Katherine Hamilton Maternal Grandfather, Alexander, Duke of Albany

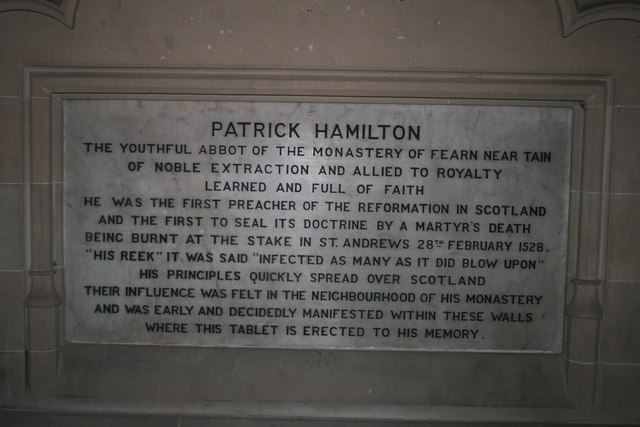
Patrick Hamilton Plaque, St Duthus Memorial Church, Tain

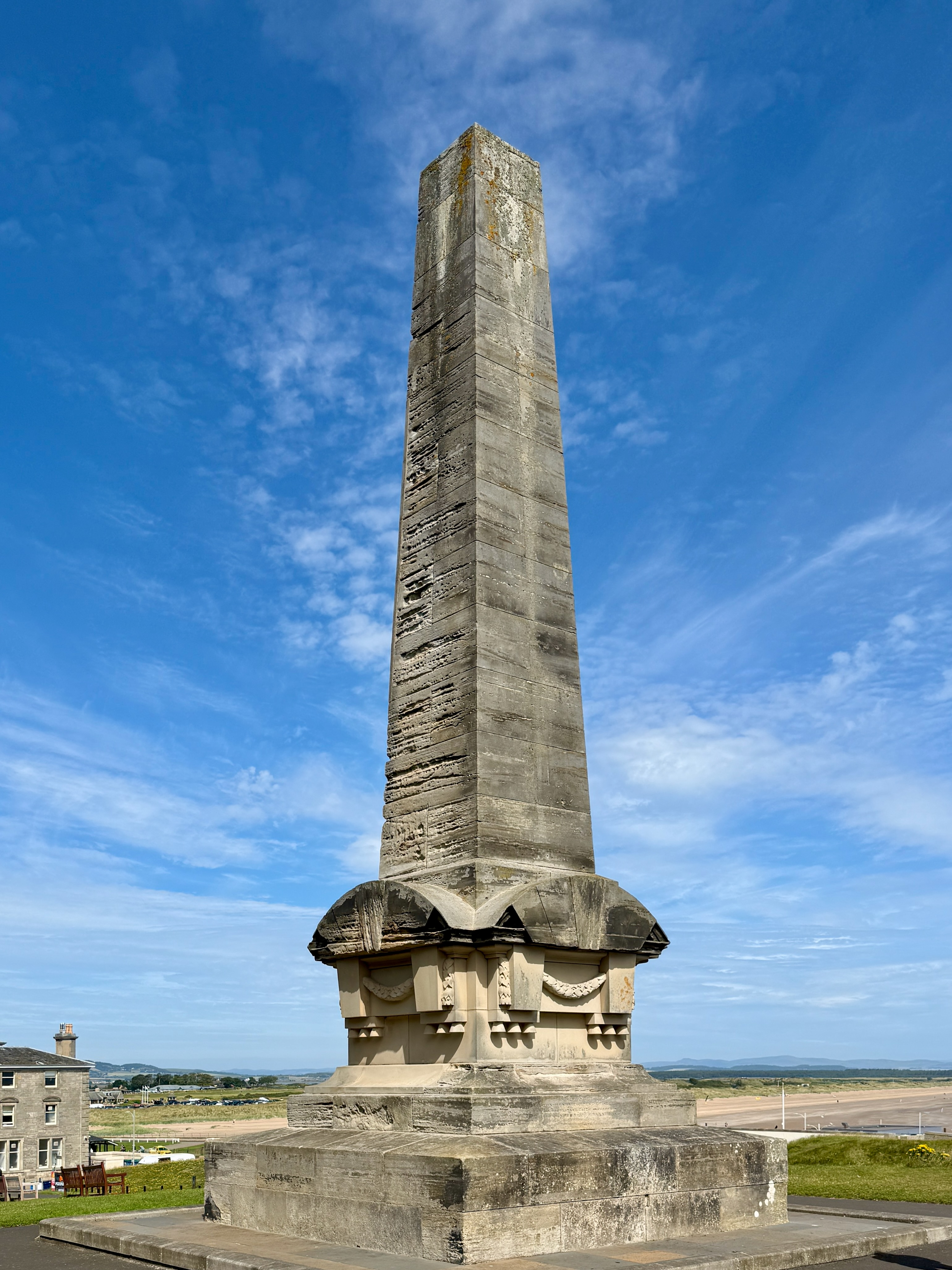
The Martyrs' Monument, St Andrews, which commemorates Hamilton and three other martyrs: Henry Forrest, George Wishart and Walter Milne

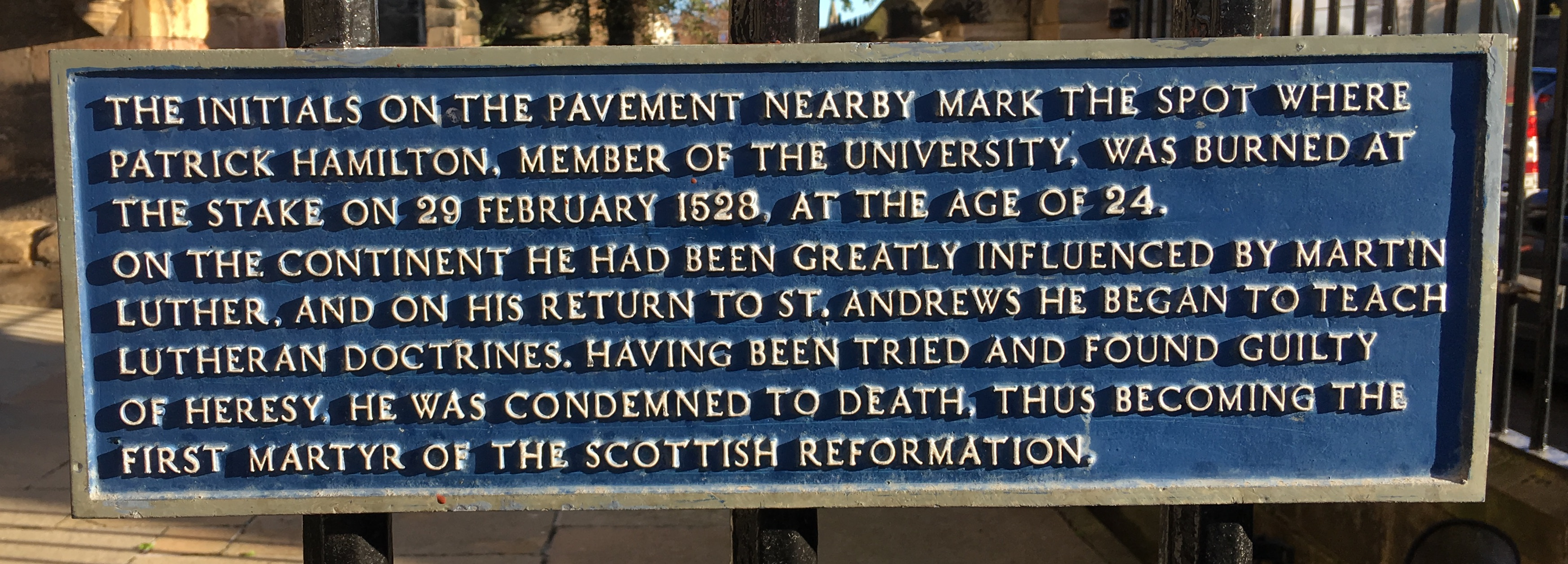
Patrick Hamilton initials plaque, St Andrews, Fife, Scotland

Patrick Hamilton (1504 – 29 February 1528) was a Scottish Roman Catholic priest and an early Protestant Reformer in Scotland. He travelled to Europe, where he met several of the leading reformed thinkers, before returning to Scotland to preach the doctrines of Lutheranism. Hamilton began preaching in Scotland in 1527 and was invited as a friend by Archbishop James Beaton to a conference in St. Andrews. Instead, he was tried for heresy by an Ecclesiastical tribunal led by Archbishop Beaton. He was found guilty, handed over to the secular executioner, and burnt at the stake in St Andrews.

Hamilton's judges considered themselves to be defending the Catholic Church in Scotland and enforcing the traditional principle of Canon law that "error has no rights"; Hamilton's calm demeanor in the face of death won the admiration of those present and his death was widely publicized using the new technologies of the Gutenberg Revolution. Hamilton's trial and execution accordingly backfired dramatically, as still often happens during religious persecution of any kind. After Hamilton's death, others who had Lutheran New Testaments or who professed Protestant doctrines were also burned or sentenced to severe punishments. Since the Scottish Reformation Parliament of 1560, the site of Hamilton's execution has been treated with enormous respect, even by the students and faculty of the University of St Andrews.

== Early life ==
Hamilton was the second son of Sir Patrick Hamilton of Kincavil and Margaret Stewart, daughter of Alexander, Duke of Albany, second son of James II of Scotland. He was born in the diocese of Glasgow, probably at his father's estate of Stanehouse in Lanarkshire, and was most likely educated at Linlithgow. In 1517 he was appointed titular Abbot of Fearn Abbey, Ross-shire. The income from this position paid for him to study at the University of Paris, where he became a Master of the Arts in 1520. It was in Paris, where Martin Luther's writings were already exciting much discussion, that he first learnt the doctrines he would later uphold. According to sixteenth century theologian Alexander Ales, Hamilton subsequently went to Leuven, attracted probably by the fame of Erasmus, who in 1521 had his headquarters there.

== Return and flight ==
Returning to Scotland, Hamilton selected St Andrews, the capital of the Catholic Church in Scotland and of education, as his residence. On 9 June 1523 he became a member of St Leonard's College, part of the University of St Andrews, and on 3 October 1524 he was admitted to its faculty of arts, where he was first a student of, and then a colleague of the Renaissance humanist and logician John Mair. At the university Hamilton attained such influence that he was permitted, as precentor, to conduct a Solemn High Mass based on music of his own composition at the St. Andrew's Cathedral.

The reforming doctrines, however, had obtained a firm hold on the young abbot, and he was eager to communicate them to his fellow-countrymen. Early in 1527 the attention of James Beaton, Archbishop of St Andrews, was directed to the heretical preaching of the young priest, whereupon he ordered that Hamilton should be formally tried. Hamilton fled to Germany, enrolling himself as a student, under Franz Lambert of Avignon, in the new University of Marburg, opened on 30 May 1527 by Philip of Hesse. Among those he met there were Hermann von dem Busche, one of the contributors to the Epistolæ Obscurorum Virorum, John Frith and William Tyndale.

Late in the autumn of 1527, Fr. Hamilton returned to Scotland, speaking openly of his convictions. He went first to his brother's house at Kincavel, near Linlithgow, where he preached frequently, and, soon afterwards, he renounced clerical celibacy and married a young lady of noble rank; her name is unrecorded. David Beaton, the Abbot of Arbroath, avoiding open violence through fear of Hamilton's powerful protectors, invited him to a conference at St Andrews. The Young minister, predicting that he was going to "confirm the pious in the true doctrine" by his death, accepted the invitation, and for nearly a month was allowed to preach and to debate.

With the publication of Patrick's Places in 1528, he introduced into Scottish theology Martin Luther's emphasis of the distinction of Law and Gospel.

== Trial and execution ==
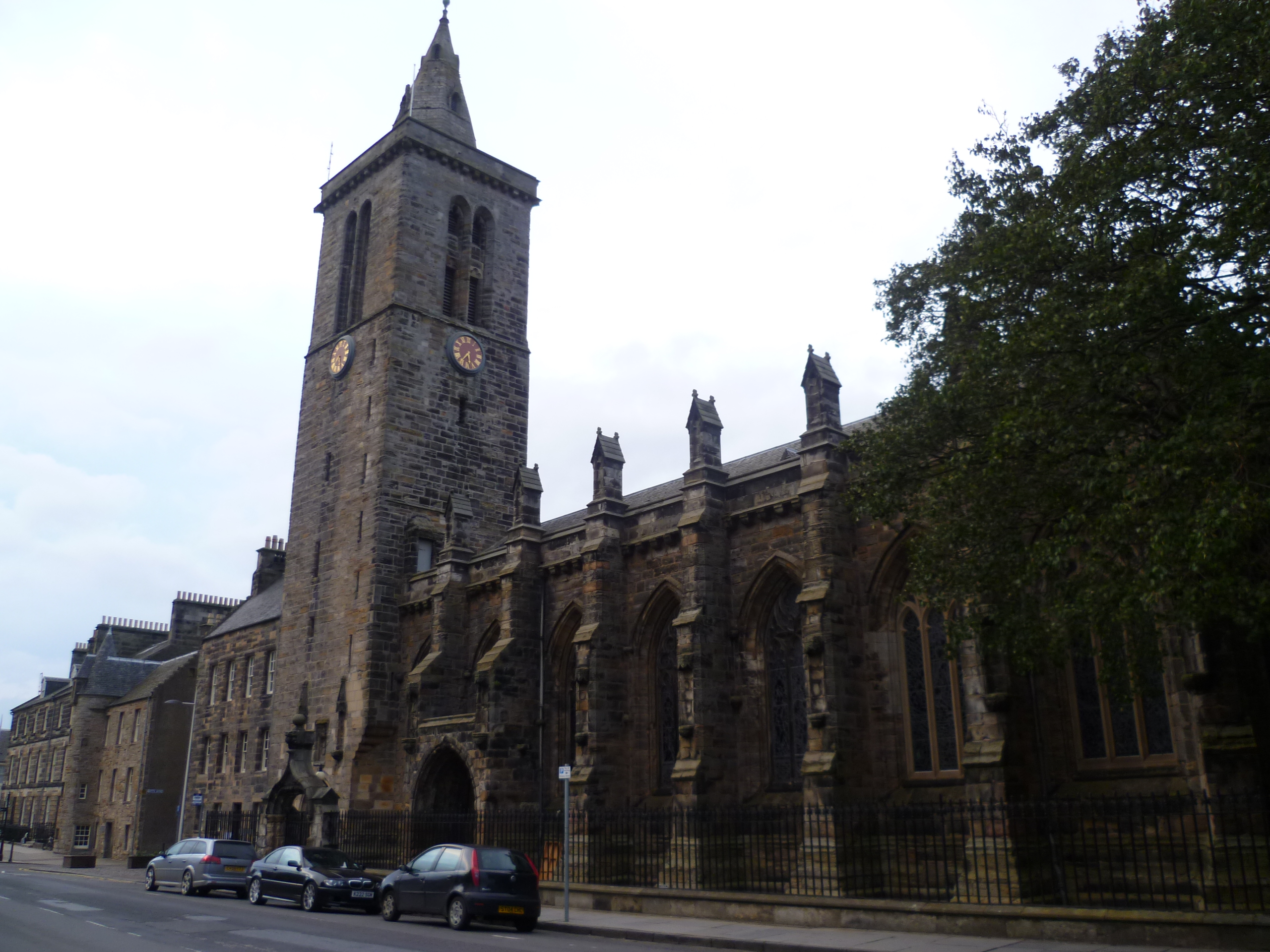
St. Salvator's College and Chapel

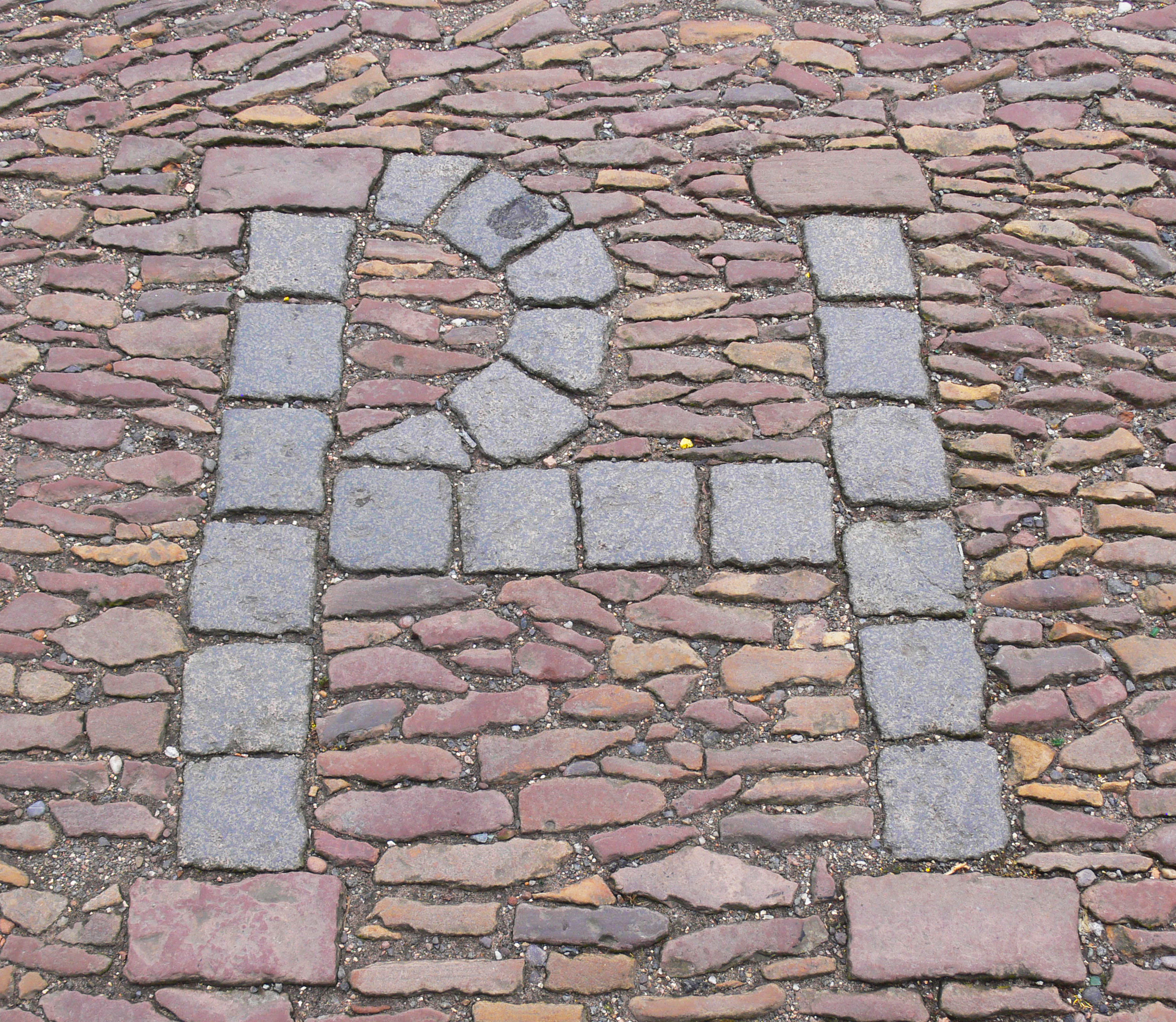
Patrick Hamilton's initials, set into paving at the place of his execution, to commemorate his martyrdom.

At length, he was summoned before a council of bishops and clergy presided over by the archbishop. There were thirteen charges, seven based on the doctrines in Philip Melanchthon's Loci Communes, the first theological exposition of Martin Luther's scriptural study and teachings in 1521. On examination Hamilton expressed a belief in their truth and the council sentenced him to death on all thirteen charges. Hamilton was seized and allegedly surrendered to the soldiery based on an assurance that he would be restored to his friends without injury. However, after a debate with Friar Campbell, the council handed him over to the secular power to be burned at the stake outside the front entrance to St Salvator's Chapel in St Andrews. The sentence was carried out on the same day to avoid rescue by his uncle and preclude any attempted rescue by friends. He burned from noon to 6 p.m. and his last words were "Lord Jesus, receive my spirit". The spot is today marked with a monogram of his initials (PH) set into the cobblestones of the pavement of North Street, which students avoid stepping on to this day out of respect and to prevent poor marks on their exams.

== Legacy ==
Hamilton's execution attracted more interest than ever before to Lutheranism and greatly contributed to the Reformation in Scotland. It was said that the "reek of Master Patrick Hamilton infected as many as it blew upon". Hamilton's fortitude during his execution persuaded Alexander Ales, who had been appointed to convince Hamilton of his errors, to enter into the Lutheran Church. His martyrdom is unusual in that he was almost alone in Scotland during the Lutheran stage of the Reformation. His only known writings, based upon Loci communes and known as "Patrick's Places", echoed the doctrine of justification by faith and the contrast between the gospel and the law in a series of clear-cut propositions.'"Patrickes Places"' was not Hamilton's own title, but was given in the translation into English by John Fryth in 1564, and are presented in Book 8 of the 1570 edition of John Foxe's "Acts and Monuments"..

Students at the University of St Andrews traditionally avoid stepping on the monogram of Hamilton's initials outside St Salvator's Chapel for fear of being cursed and failing their final exams. To lift the curse students may participate in the annual May dip where they traditionally run into the North Sea at 05.00 to wash away their sins and bad luck.

A school in Auckland, New Zealand called 'Saint Kentigern College' has a house named after Patrick Hamilton

== Katherine Hamilton ==
Patrick's sister, Katherine Hamilton, was the wife of the Captain of Dunbar Castle and also a committed Protestant. In March 1539 she was forced in exile to Berwick upon Tweed for her beliefs. She had been in England before and met the Queen, Jane Seymour.

According to the historian John Spottiswood, Katherine was brought to trial for heresy before James V at Holyroodhouse in 1534, and her other brother James Hamilton of Livingston fled. The King was impressed by her conviction shown in her short answer to the prosecutor. He laughed and spoke to her privately, convincing her to abandon her profession of faith. The other accused also recanted for the time.

A play about Katherine, with Patrick as a secondary character, was written by Rona Munro, and performed on tour in 2024.

== Bibliography ==
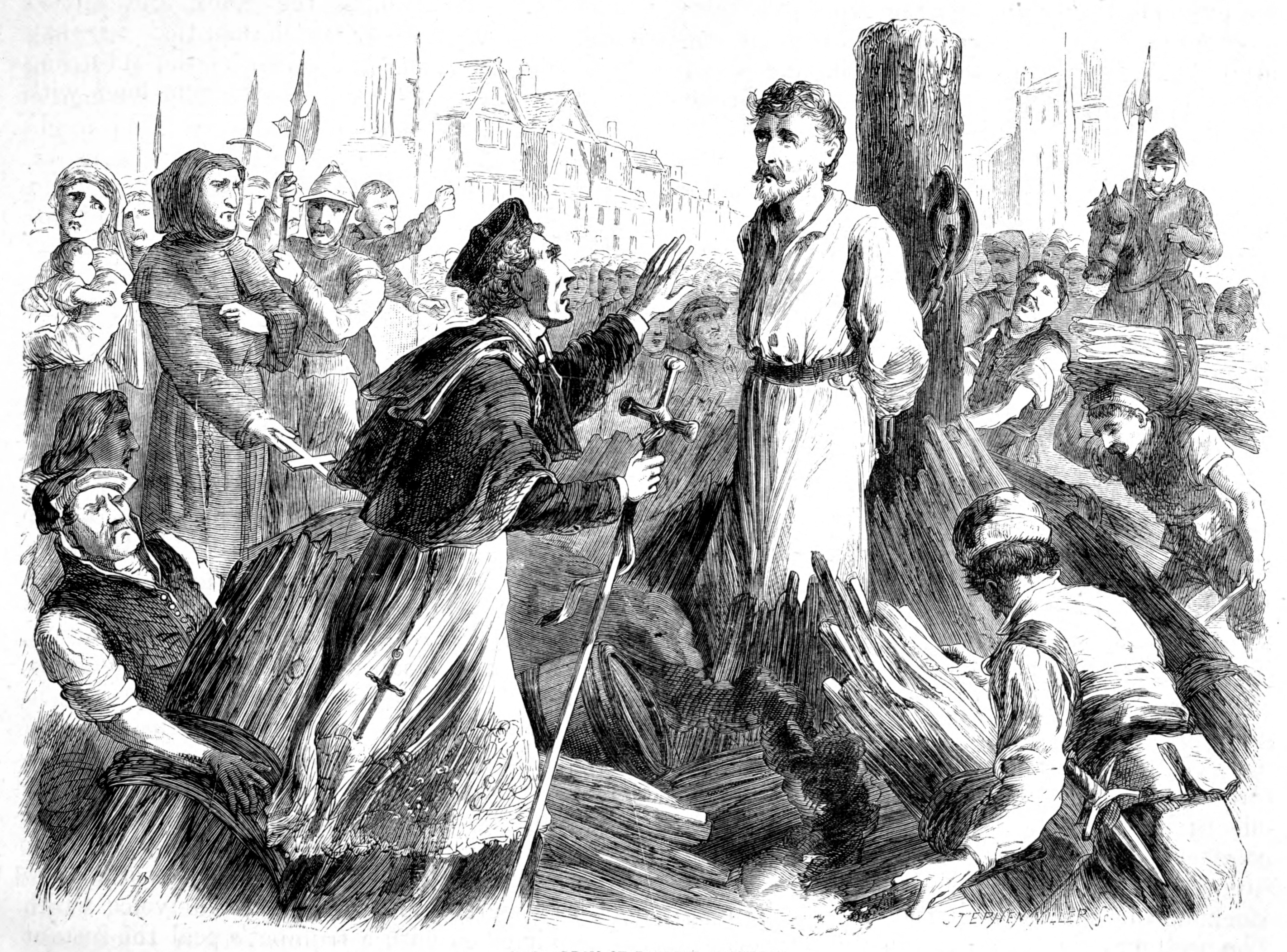
The death of Patrick Hamilton

For a more extensive bibliography see George M. Ella's book review.
Mackay's bibliography:

- Knox's Hist, of the Reformation
- Buchanan and Lindsay of Pitscottie's Histories of Scotland
- the writings of Alexander Alesius and the records of St. Andrews and Paris are the original authorities
- Life of Patrick Hamilton, by the Rev. Peter Lorimer, 1857, to which this article is much indebted
- Patrick Hamilton, a poem by T. B. Johnston of Cairnie, 1873
- Rainer Haas, Franz Lambert und Patrick Hamilton in ihrer Bedeutung für die Evangelische Bewegung auf den Britischen Inseln, Marburg (theses) 1973
- The most recent biography in almost 100 years Patrick Hamilton – The Stephen of Scotland (1504-1528): The First Preacher and Martyr of the Scottish Reformation, by Joe R. D. Carvalho, AD Publications, Dundee 2009.
- Schaal, Katharina: Der Märtyrer. Fundstücke aus Marburgs Uniarchiv: Hinrichtung eines Alumnus [Patrick Hamilton]. In: Marburger UniJournal Nr. 56 (2018), p. 35.

== See also ==
- Scottish Reformation
- Alexander Cameron (priest)
- John Ogilvie (saint)
- List of Protestant martyrs of the Scottish Reformation
