= Thomas Forret =

Scottish vicar and martyr

Thomas Forret (died 28 February or 1 March 1539), was vicar of Dollar, Clackmannanshire, and a Scottish martyr.

== Early life and Canon Regular ==
Forret was descended from an old family which possessed the estate of Forret in the parish of Logie, Fife, from the reign of William the Lion till the seventeenth century. The surname is sometimes erroneously given as Forrest. His father had been master stabler to James IV. The Catholic priest, Sir John Forret, for permitting whom to administer the sacrament of baptism at Swinton in 1573 the Bishop of St Andrews was complained against, was probably a near relative. After obtaining a good preliminary education, Forret was, through the "help of a rich lady," sent to study at Cologne. On his return he became a canon regular in the monastery of "Sanct Colmes Inche" (Inchcolm in the Firth of Forth). The canons having, it is said, begun to manifest their discontent at their daily allowance, the abbot, in order to divert their attention from their personal grievances, gave them the works of Augustine to study instead of the book of their foundation. Its perusal effected a radical change in the thoughts of many of the recluses. "O happy and blessed," afterwards said Forret, "was that book by which I came to the knowledge of the truth!" The abbot to whom he made known his change of opinions advised him to keep his mind to himself; but Forret converted the younger canons, although "the old bottels," he said, "would not receive the new wine."

== Vicar of Dollar ==
Afterwards he became vicar of Dollar, Clackmannanshire, where he preached every Sunday to his parishioners on the Epistles and Gospels. At that time in Scotland, only black friars (Dominicans) and grey friars (Franciscans) were in the habit of preaching. The friars, offended at the innovation, denounced him to George Crichton, the Bishop of Dunkeld as a heretic, and one that "shewed the mysteries of the Scriptures to the vulgar people in English." The bishop, who had no interest whatever in ecclesiastical controversies, remonstrated with Forret not only for preaching "every Sunday," but for the more serious offence of not taking the usual due from the parishioners when any one died, of "the cow and the uppermost cloth," remarking that the people would expect others to do as he did. He advised Forret, therefore, if he was determined to preach, to preach only on "one good Epistle or one good Gospell that setteth forth the libertie of the holie church." On Forret explaining that he had never found any evil epistle or gospel in the New or Old Testament, then "spake my lord stoutlie and said, 'I thank God that I never knew what the Old and the New Testament was.'" This innocent instance of devout gratitude on the part of the bishop gave rise to a proverb in Scotland: "Ye are like the Bishop of Dunkeld that knew neither the new law nor the old law."

Forret systematically warned his parishioners against the sellers of indulgences. He also took care specially to teach them the ten commandments, and composed a short catechism for their instruction on points of prime importance in Christian belief. He was in the habit of carrying bread and cheese in his gown sleeve to any poor person who was ill. He studied from six in the morning till twelve, and again from dinner till supper, and, in order the better to hold his own against disputants, committed three chapters of the New Testament in Latin to memory every day, making his servant, Andrew Kirkie, hear him repeat them at night.

== Trial and execution ==
Though summoned several times before the Bishop of Dunkeld, he escaped further interference until February 1539–40, when he and four others were summoned before David Beaton (the archbishop of St Andrews), Gavin Dunbar (the archbishop of Glasgow), and William Chisholm (the Bishop of Dunblane) as "chief heretics and teachers of heresy," and especially for being present at the marriage of the vicar of Tullibodie, and for eating flesh during Lent at the marriage. They were burned on the Castle Hill of Edinburgh on 28 February.

== See also ==
List of Protestant martyrs of the Scottish Reformation

== External sources ==
- Foxe's Book of Martyrs, 1583 edition, p. 1290
- Calderwood, David (1842). The history of the Kirk of Scotland. Edinburgh: Wodrow Society. p. 124.

This article incorporates text from a publication now in the public domain: "Forret, Thomas". Dictionary of National Biography. London: Smith, Elder & Co. 1885–1900.
