= Henry Forrest (martyr) =

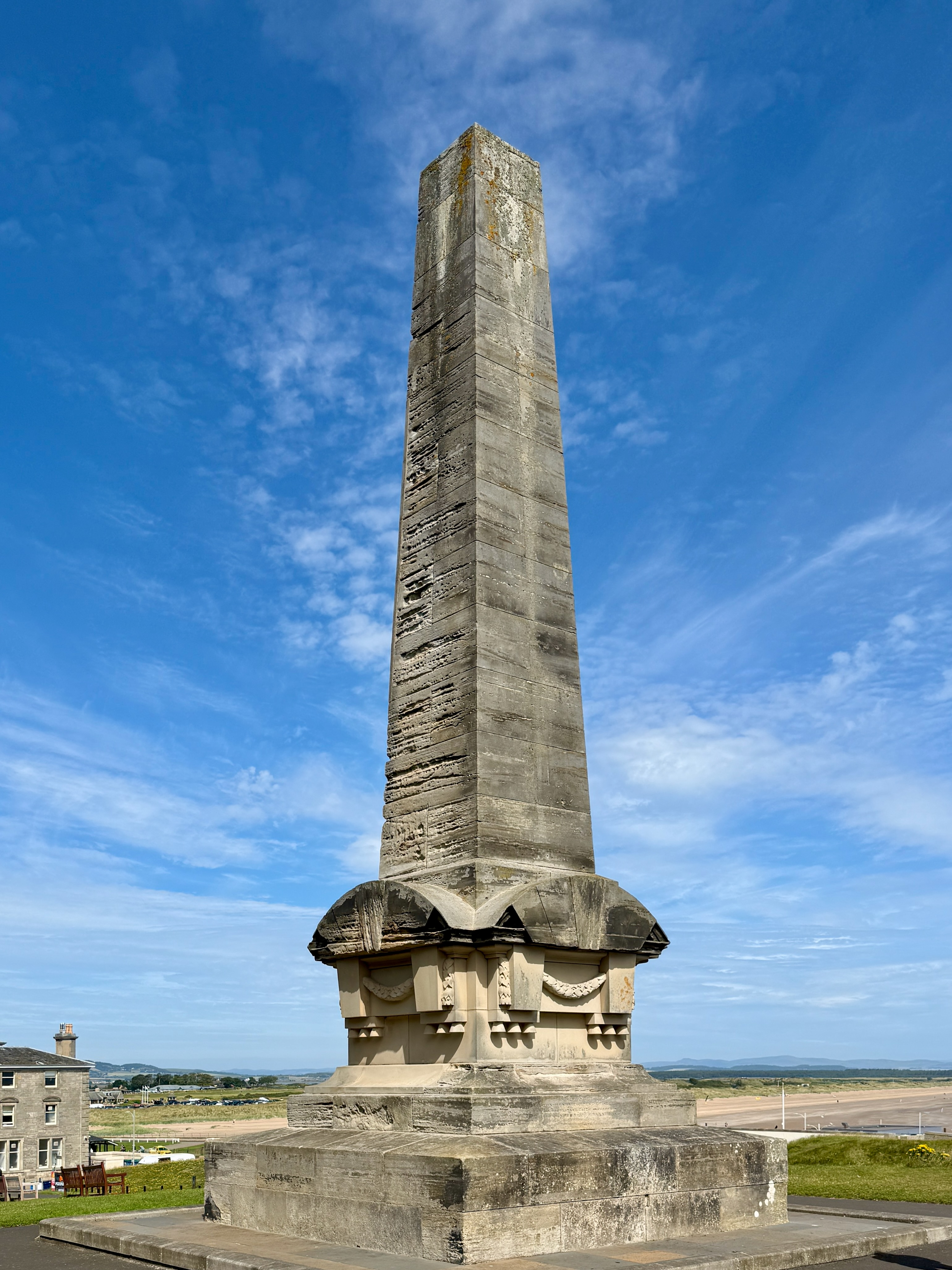
The Martyrs' Monument, St Andrews, which commemorates Forrest and three other martyrs: Patrick Hamilton, George Wishart And Walter Milne

Henry Forrest or Forres (d. 1533?), was a Scottish martyr.

== Historical clarification of Forrest's identity ==
Forrest is referred to by John Knox as "of Linlithgow," and John Foxe describes him as a "young man born in Linlithgow." David Laing, in his edition of Knox's Works, conjectures that he may have been the son of "Thomas Forrest of Linlithgow" mentioned in the treasurer's accounts as receiving various sums for the "bigging of the dyke about the paliss of Linlithgow."

Laing also states that the name "Henricus Forrus" occurs in the list of students who became Bachelors of Arts at the University of Glasgow in 1518, but supposes with more likelihood that he was identical with the "Henriccus Forrest" who was a determinant in St. Leonard's College, St. Andrews, in 1526, which would account for his special interest in the fate of Patrick Hamilton.

== Religious persecution ==
Forrest was a friar of the order of Benedictines. Knox states that Forrest suffered martyrdom for no other crime than having in his possession a New Testament in English; but Foxe gives as the chief reason that he had "affirmed and said that Mr. Patrick Hamilton died a martyr, and that his articles were true." Before being brought to trial Forrest, according to Knox, underwent "a long imprisonment in the sea tower of St. Andrews." Foxe and Spotiswood both state that the evidence against him was insufficient until a friar, Walter Laing, was sent on purpose to confess him, when he unsuspiciously revealed his sentiments in regard to Patrick Hamilton. According to Foxe he was first degraded before the "clergy in a green place," described, with apparently a somewhat mistaken knowledge of localities, as "being between the castle of St. Andrews and another place called Monimail."

He was then condemned as a heretic and burned at the north church stile of the abbey church of St. Andrews, "to the intent that all the people of Anguishe" (Angus or Forfar, on the north side of the Firth of Tay) "might see the fire, and so might be the more feared from falling into the like doctrine." When brought to the place of execution he is said to have exclaimed, "Fie on falsehood! Fie on false friars, revealers of confession!" Calderwood supposes the martyrdom to have occurred in 1529 or the year following, but as Foxe places it within five years after Hamilton's martyrdom, and Knox refers to Forrest's "long imprisonment," it in all probability took place in 1532 or 1533.

== See also ==
- List of Protestant martyrs of the Scottish Reformation
