= Crag and tail =

Geographic feature created by glaciation

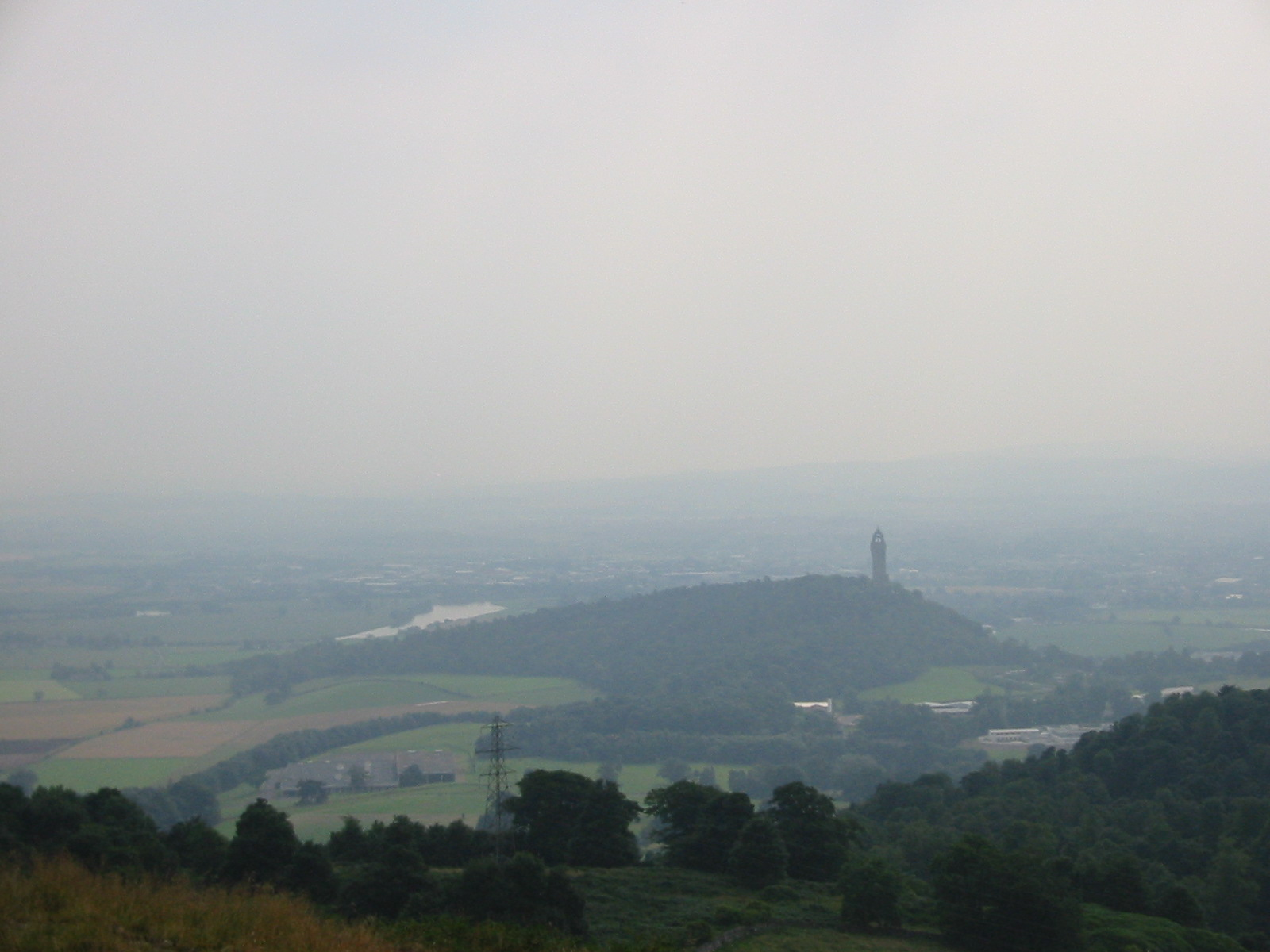
The Abbey Craig, a crag with tail near the University of Stirling. The Wallace Monument stands on the crag at the right, and the long tail slopes down leftward

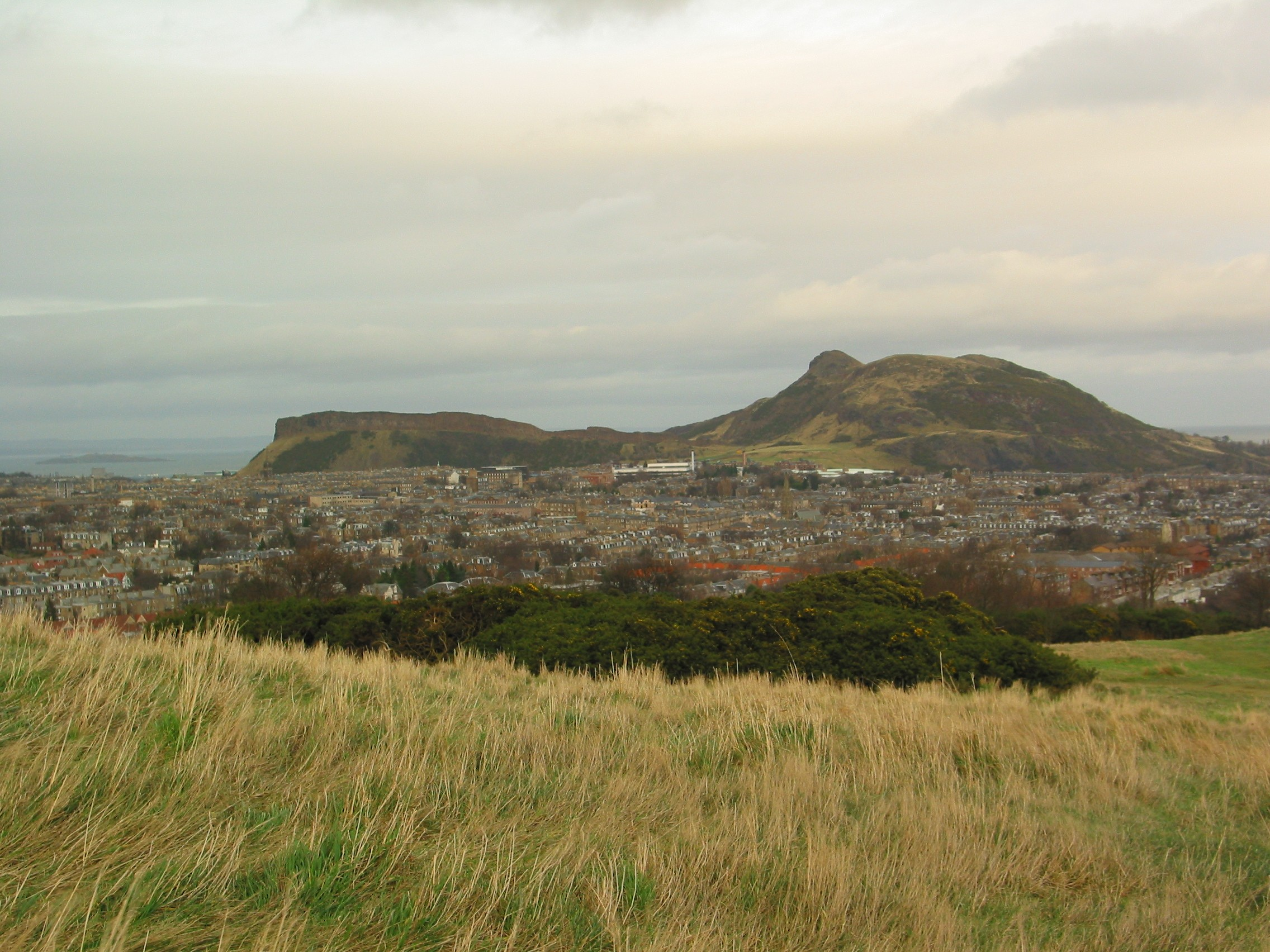
Salisbury Crags to the left and Arthur's Seat to the right, with their tails sloping east to the right.

A crag (sometimes spelled cragg, or in Scotland craig) is a rocky hill or mountain, generally isolated from other high ground.

== Origin ==
Crags are formed when a glacier or ice sheet passes over an area that contains a particularly resistant rock formation (often granite, a volcanic plug or some other volcanic structure). The force of the glacier erodes the surrounding softer material, leaving the rocky block protruding from the surrounding terrain. Frequently the crag serves as a partial shelter to softer material in the wake of the glacier, which remains as a gradual fan or ridge forming a tapered ramp (called the tail) up the leeward side of the crag.

In older examples, or those lately surrounded by the sea, the tail is often missing, having been removed by post-glacial erosion.

== Examples ==
Examples of crag and tail formations include:

- Castle Rock (the crag, site of Edinburgh Castle) and the Royal Mile (the tail), in Edinburgh, Scotland
- Salisbury Crags and Arthur's Seat, in Edinburgh
- North Berwick Law, in North Berwick, Scotland
- Three in or near Stirling, Scotland, including the rock on which Stirling Castle stands
- "Scrabo Hill" in Newtownards, Northern Ireland, site of the Scrabo Tower
- Ailsa Craig, famous for curling stone mining
- Crag and tail features have been identified on the Amundsen Sea continental shelf off West Antarctica.

== See also ==
- Drumlin
- Roche moutonnée
