= Lauriston Castle, Aberdeenshire =

Historic baronial fortress

Coordinates: 56.7896°N 2.3955°W

Lauriston Castle
- St Cyrus, Scotland; NO761666
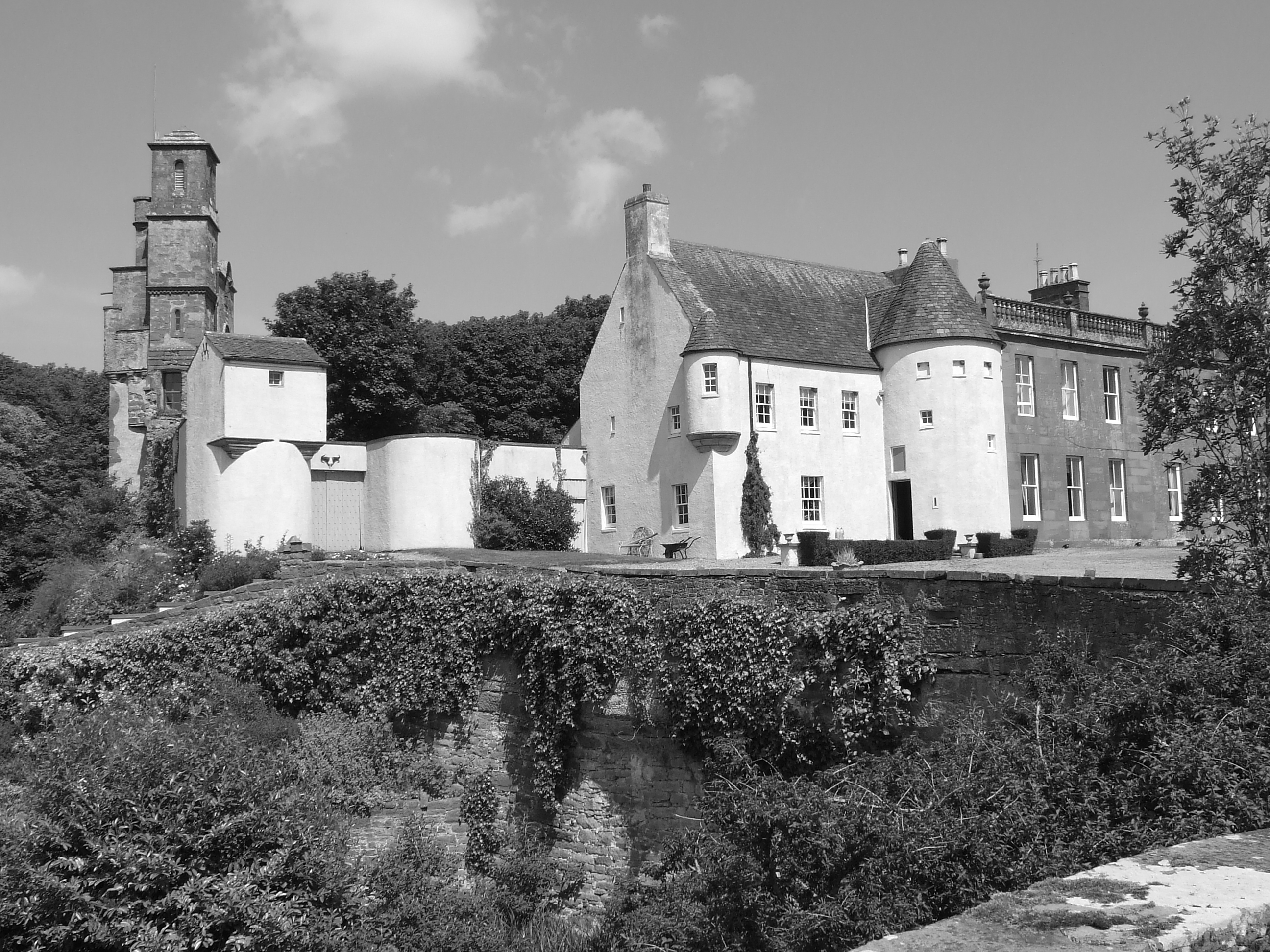
- Lauriston Castle from the south

Site information
- Type: Courtyard castle with later additions
- Owner: Private
- Open to the public: Not open to public

Site history
- Built: 13th century onwards
- In use: 13th century onwards

Lauriston Castle stands on a clifftop site near the Aberdeenshire village of St Cyrus and just over a mile inland from the North Sea coast of Scotland. Once a royal fortress, it can claim to be one of the oldest privately owned and inhabited castles in the region. It is a Category C listed building.

== History ==
=== 9th century ===
By tradition, it was the stronghold of Giric, Grig or Gregory the Great, one of the last of the Pictish kings (AD 878–889). The site of his church of Ecclesgreig (Eglise Grig) is nearby and he gave his Latin name, Ciricius, to St. Cyrus.

=== 13th – 17th centuries ===
Lauriston’s first charter is dated 1243 and it soon developed into a classic courtyard castle which was savagely fought over during Scotland's Wars of Independence and strengthened by King Edward III in 1336 as part of the chain of strongholds which he hoped would prevent a French landing in support of the Scots.

One of the corner towers on the edge of the cliff was incorporated into a typical laird’s house in the 1500s. In turn, this house was absorbed into a very large Georgian mansion of Palladian design, dated 1765–89.

For nearly 450 years Lauriston was held by the Stratons, whose arms of 1292 are among the earliest recorded in Scotland. The eloquent Declaration of Arbroath, the famous letter of 1320 to Pope John XXII, sealed by the nation’s earls and barons, has as its final signatory the name of Alexander Straton.

Another Straton, the “noble knicht o’ Lauriston”, fell at the Battle of Harlaw in 1411, and shortly afterwards his son was involved in the affair of the Sheriff’s Kettle. The barons of the Mearns had been complaining about the high-handed behaviour of John Melville of Glenbervie, Sheriff of Kincardineshire, and King James’s Regent, the Duke of Albany, exclaimed in exasperation that he would not mind if they "biled the loon and suppit the bree". Taking this as royal licence, a group of barons lured Melville to a hunting party, tipped him into a cauldron or kettle of boiling water and, to seal the conspiracy, supped the broth.

The Stratons continued, however, to prosper at Lauriston, even surviving the events of 1534, when David Straton fell out with the Church over payment of tithes on the salmon fishery. He objected to giving every tenth fish to the Abbot of Arbroath and told “his servants to cast the tenth fish into the sea againe", saying that God could catch his own. For this evasion of Church taxes he was taken to Edinburgh and condemned to death, thus becoming one of Scotland's first Protestant martyrs.

=== 17th – 18th centuries ===
In 1695, the Stratons were forced to sell Lauriston. Under the charter to the new owner, Court of Session Judge, Sir James Falconer of Phesdo, the estate became a burgh of barony, with a freeport at Miltonhaven. The name of the barony was also changed to Miltonhaven, but storms in the 1790s swept away both the port and village, leaving Lauriston to be known as “The Drown’d Barony”. Over the following century, the policies were developed in fashionable Picturesque style - a designed landscape "of very high quality", with waterfalls, walks and a two-acre walled garden.

=== 20th century ===
Following its use as RAF barracks during World War II, part of the mansion was demolished, and according to Nigel Tranter, the castle had “fallen on evil days indeed”.

Lauriston's Great Hall and Doocot Tower were rebuilt in the late 1980s by William and Dorothy Newlands of Lauriston to plans drawn up by architect Ian Begg. The doocot received a Glenfiddich Living Scotland Award in 1992.

Lady Lauriston is past chair of the Scottish Castles Association and served as Prime Warden of the Worshipful Company of Basketmakers.

== See also ==
- Restoration of castles in Scotland
