= Castle Rock (Edinburgh) =

Volcanic rock in Edinburgh, Scotland

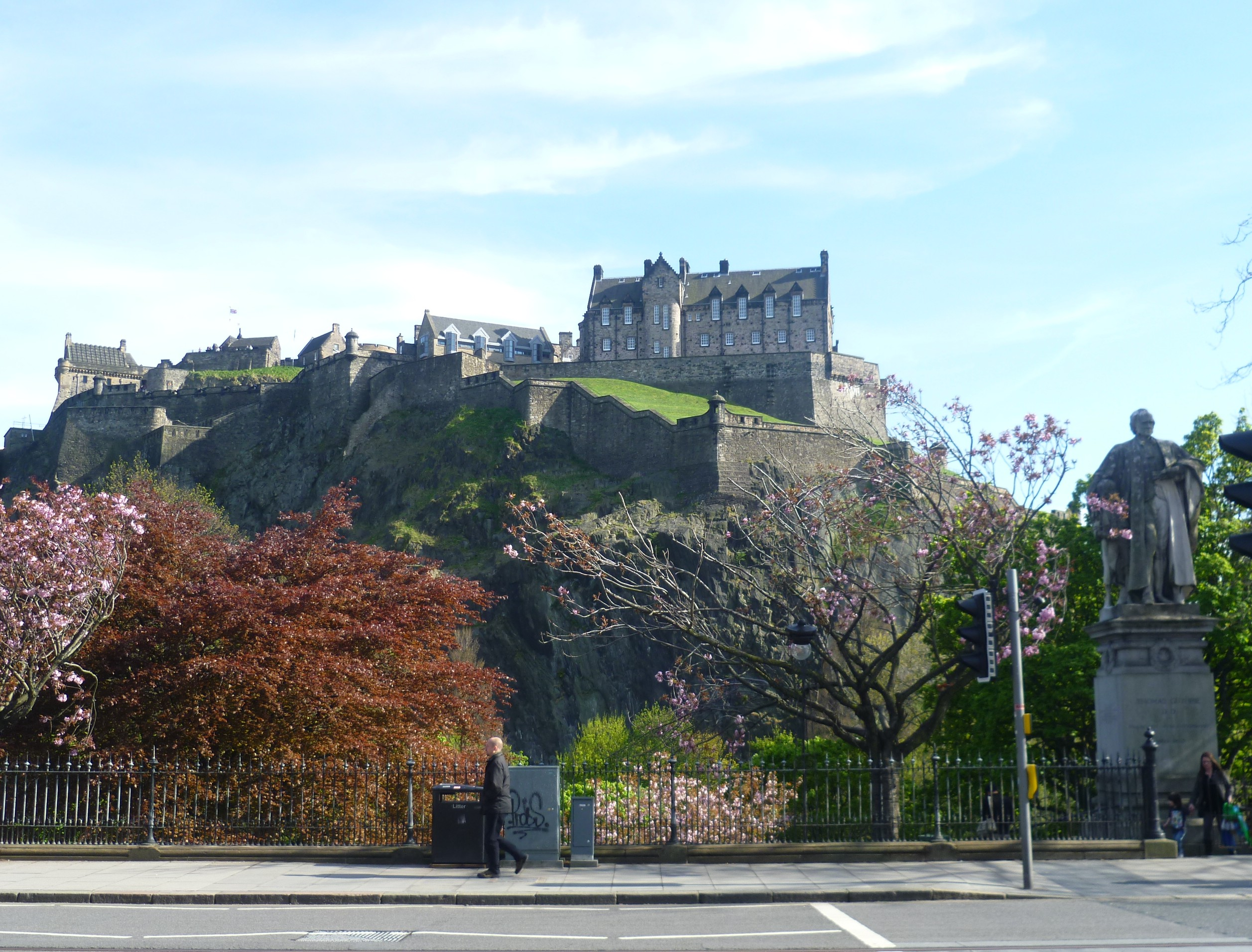
- Castle Rock as seen from Princes Street

Highest point
- Elevation: 140 m (460 ft)
- Prominence: c. 80 m (260 ft)
- Listing: Tump
- Coordinates: 55°56′55″N 03°12′03″W

Geography
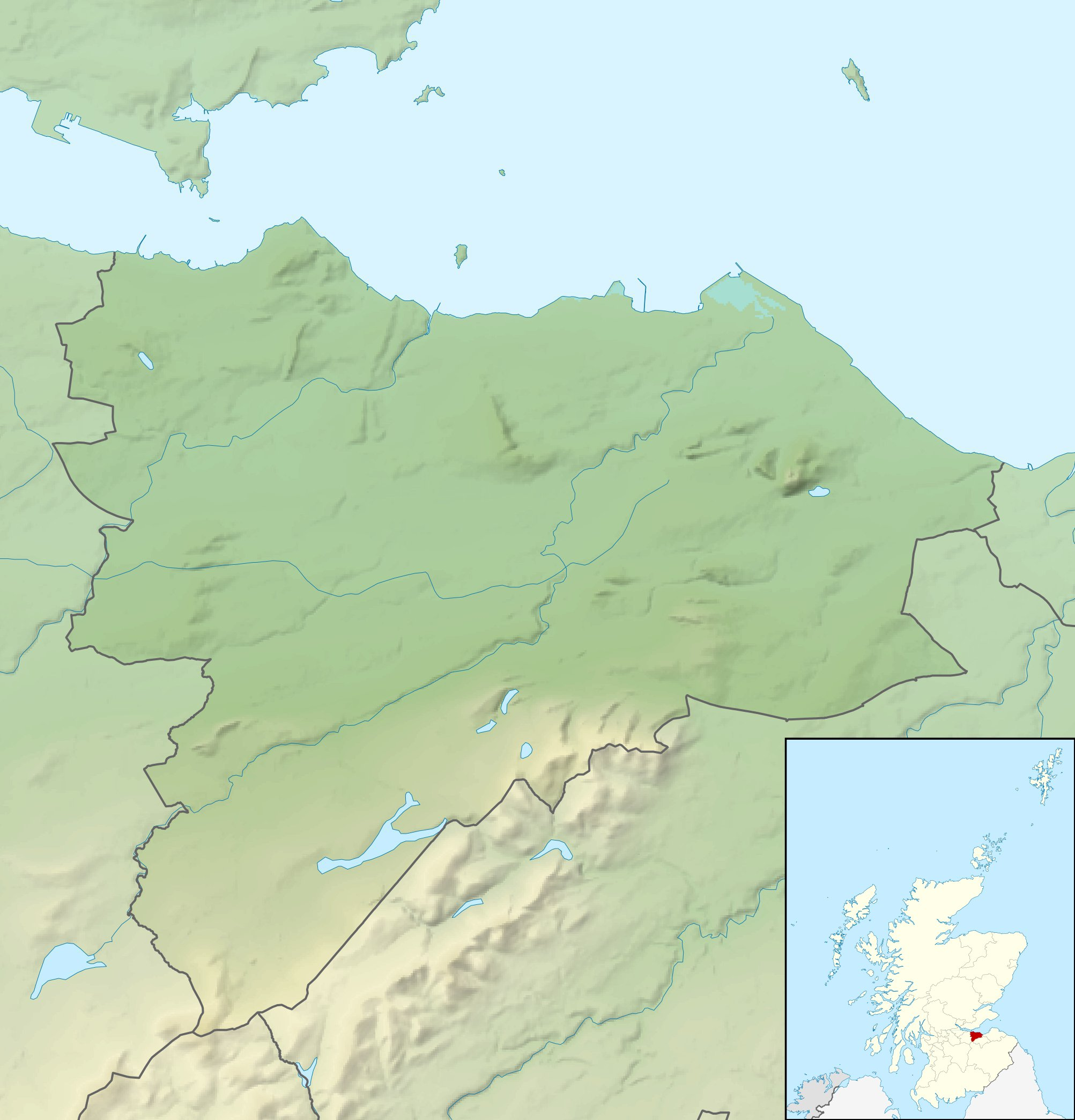
- Location within Edinburgh Location within the City of Edinburgh council area Location within Scotland
- Location: Edinburgh, Scotland
- Topo map: OS Landranger 66

Geology
- Rock age: ~350 million years
- Mountain type(s): Crag and tail, volcanic plug

Climbing
- First ascent: Unknown

Castle Rock (Scottish Gaelic: Creag a' Chaisteil, Scottish Gaelic pronunciation: [ˈkʰʲɾʲekˈaˈxaʃtʰʲɪl]) or Edinburgh Rock is a volcanic plug in the middle of Edinburgh upon which Edinburgh Castle sits. The rock is estimated to have formed some 350 million years ago during the early Carboniferous period. It is the remains of a volcanic pipe which cut through the surrounding sedimentary rock, before cooling to form very hard dolerite, a coarser-grained equivalent of basalt. Subsequent glacial erosion was resisted more by the dolerite, which protected the softer rock to the east, leaving a crag and tail formation.

The summit of the castle rock is 130 m (430 ft) above sea level, with rocky cliffs to the south, west and north, rearing up to 80 m (260 ft) from the surrounding landscape. This means that the only readily accessible route to the castle lies to the east, where the ridge slopes more gently. The defensive advantage of such a site is clear, but the geology of the rock also presents difficulties, since basalt is an extremely poor aquifer. Providing water to the Upper Ward of the castle was problematic, and despite the sinking of a 28 m (92 ft) deep well, the water supply often ran out during drought or siege, for example during the Lang Siege of 1573.
