= John Harrison (disambiguation) =

John Harrison (1693–1776) was a clockmaker who designed and built the world's first successful marine chronometers.

John Harrison may also refer to:

== Arts and entertainment ==
- John Harrison (engraver) (1872–1954), British stamp engraver
- M. John Harrison (born 1945), English novelist and short story writer
- John Kent Harrison (born 1947), Canadian television producer, director and writer
- John Harrison (director) (born 1948), American filmmaker, musician and composer
- John Harrison (fl. 1960s), British folk musician with The Watersons
- John Harrison (fl. 1970s), English bassist for Hawkwind

== Business and industry ==
- John Harrison (Leeds) (1579–1656), English merchant and benefactor
- John Harrison (historian) (1847–1922), Scottish merchant, master tailor and historical author
- John Harrison (ice cream taster) (born 1942), American ice cream taster

== Law and politics ==
- John Harrison alias Hall (died 1558), English member of parliament (MP) for Dunwich
- John Harrison (died 1669) (1590–1669), English politician, MP for Lancaster
- John Harrison (diplomat) (fl. 1610s), English diplomat
- John Scott Harrison (1804–1878), American congressman for Ohio; son of president William Henry Harrison and father of president Benjamin Harrison
- John B. Harrison (1861–1947), American jurist; Oklahoma Supreme Court justice
- John Harrison (Canadian politician) (1908–1964), Canadian MP for Meadow Lake, Saskatchewan
- John C. Harrison (judge) (1913–2011), American jurist; Montana Supreme Court justice
- Richard Harrison (New Zealand politician) (John Richard Harrison, 1921–2003), New Zealand politician
- John C. Harrison (law professor) (fl. 1970s–2020s), American law professor
- John Harrison (mayor) (fl. 1980s–2020s), English politician; mayor of North Tyneside

== Science and medicine ==
- John Vernon Harrison (1892–1972), British structural geologist, explorer and cartographer
- J. Hartwell Harrison (John Hartwell Harrison, 1909–1984), American urologic surgeon
- John Leonard Harrison (1917–1972), British zoologist

== Sports ==
- Jack Harrison (American football) (John Martin Harrison, 1875–1952), American football coach and player, politician, businessman
- Jack Harrison (boxer) (John Harrison, 1888–1970), British boxer
- John Harrison (rower) (1924–2012), Australian Olympic rower
- John Harrison (footballer, born 1927) (1927–2015), English professional footballer
- John Harrison (footballer, born 1961), English professional footballer
- John Harrison (sprinter) (born 1949), English sprinter

== Others ==
- John Harrison (VC 1857) (1832–1865), Irish recipient of the Victoria Cross
- Jack Harrison (VC) (1890–1917), English army officer and recipient of the Victoria Cross
- John Henry Harrison (born 1883/1884), African-American lynching victim
- J. F. C. Harrison (John Fletcher Clews Harrison, 1921–2018), English historian

== Fictional characters ==
- John Harrison (Brookside), fictional character on the defunct British TV soap opera Brookside
- Khan Noonien Singh, the antagonist from Star Trek Into Darkness (John Harrison given as false name)
- John Harrison, fictional character on the American TV series Popular

== See also ==
- Jon Harrison (disambiguation)
- Jonathan Baxter Harrison (1835–1907), Unitarian minister and journalist
- Jack Harrison (disambiguation)
