= Anne Henslow Barnard =

Botanical artist and scientific illustrator

- Born: Anne Henslow; 23 June 1833; Cambridge, England
- Died: 19 January 1899 (aged 65); Leckhampton, Gloucestershire, England
- Known for: Botanical Illustration
- Spouse: Robert Cary Barnard (m. 1859)

Anne Henslow Barnard (1833–1899) was a 19th-century English botanical artist.

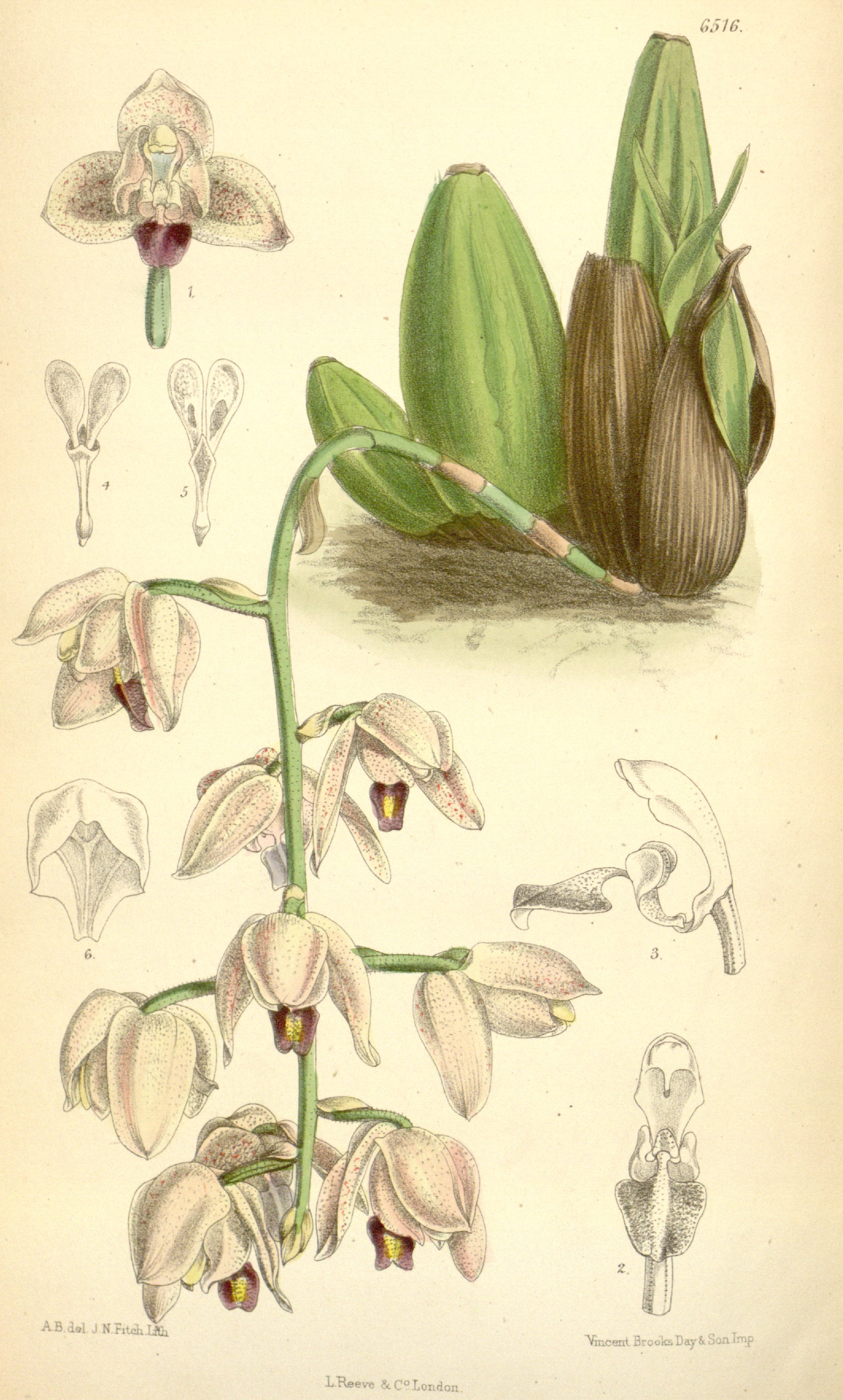
Lacaena spectabilis illustrated by Anne Henslow Barnard in Curtis's Botanical Magazine

== Biography ==
Anne Henslow was born on 23 June 1833. She was the youngest daughter of botanist and Cambridge University professor John Stevens Henslow and Harriet Jenyns, who was the daughter of clergyman George Leonard Jenyns and the sister of naturalist Leonard Jenyns. Her older sister Frances Harriet married botanist Joseph Dalton Hooker, and one of her brothers, George, became a professor of botany.

In 1859, she married army officer Robert Cary Barnard, who was the son of an old friend of her father's. They had eight children.

Barnard's father was one of the first Cambridge University professors to give illustrated lectures, for which he used poster-size illustrations. Some of these were based on rough sketches by Barnard that were then finished by the botanical artist Walter Hood Fitch.

She contributed plates to Curtis's Botanical Magazine in the years 1879–94. She also illustrated Daniel Oliver's 1864 Lessons in Elementary Botany, which was built on a manuscript left by her father. It stayed in print for several decades. Although her output was not large, she was considered a very fine botanical artist. Barnard died on 19 January 1899 at Bartlow, the house in Leckhampton where she and her husband had lived for over three decades.

== Gallery ==
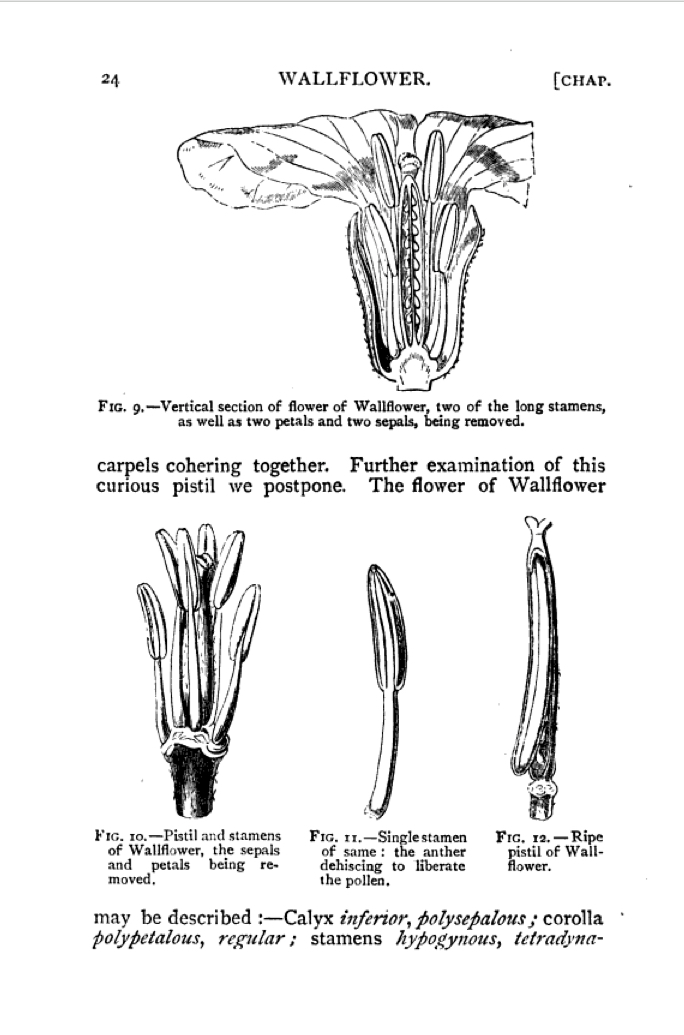

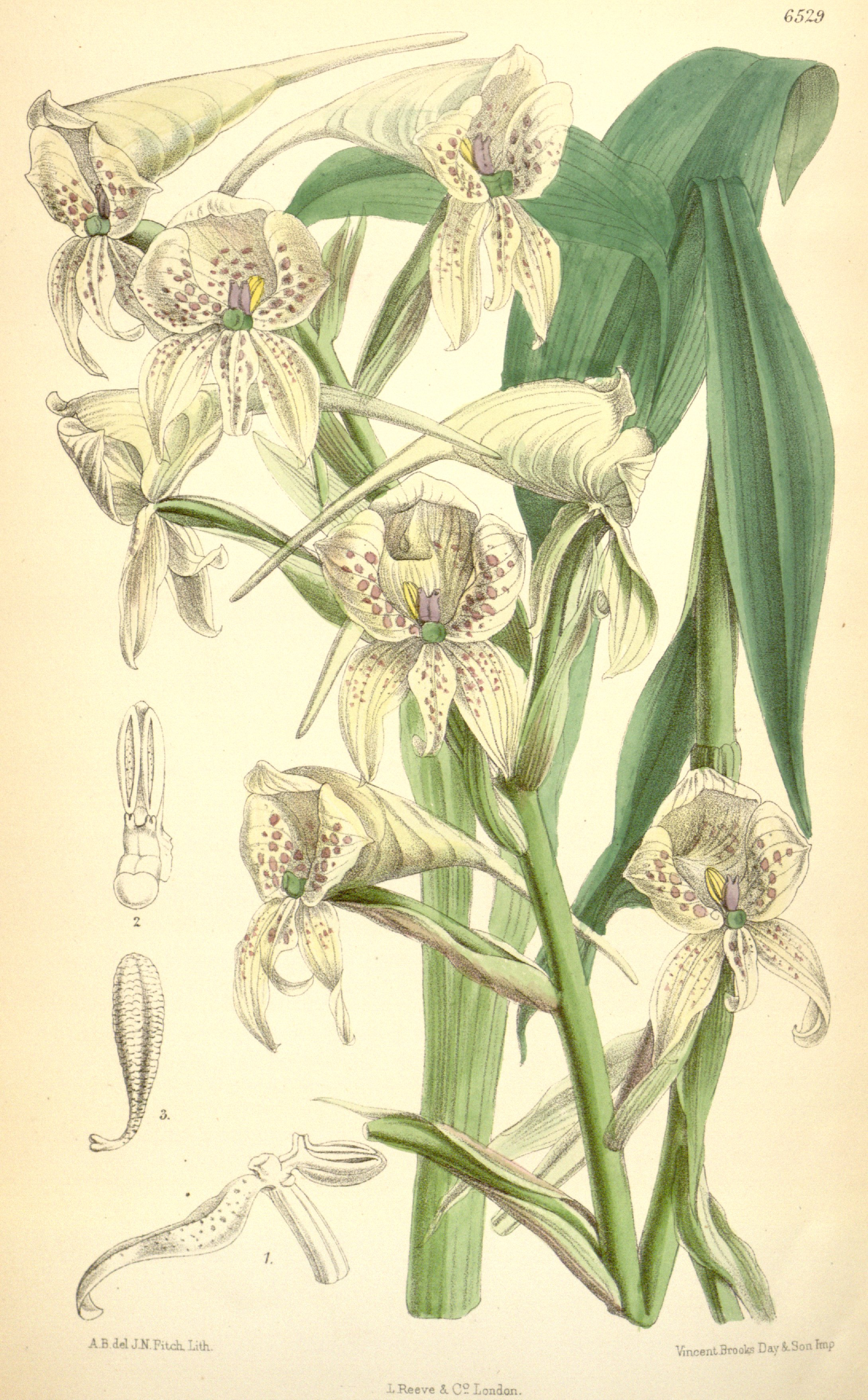
