= Jon Harrison =

Jon Harrison or Jonathan Harrison may refer to:

- Jon Harrison, member of the 1971 Oklahoma Sooners football team
- Jon Harrison, actor in the 2009 West End production of Bathhouse: The Musical!
- Jonathan Baxter Harrison (1835–1907), Unitarian minister and journalist
- Jon Harrison (U.S. Navy), former chief of staff of the United States Navy

== See also ==
- John Harrison (disambiguation)
