= Henslow =

Henslow or Henslowe is a surname. Notable people with the surname include:

- George Henslow (1835–1925), British botanist
- John Henslow (Surveyor of the Navy) (1730–1815), naval architect
- John Stevens Henslow (1796–1861), botanist, Sir John Henslow's grandson and Charles Darwin's mentor
- Francis Hartwell Henslowe (1811–1878), civil servant and composer, grandson of Sir John Henslow
- Philip Henslowe (c. 1550–1616), Elizabethan theatrical entrepreneur and impresario
