= Jack Harrison =

Jack Harrison may refer to:

- Jack Harrison (American football) (1875–1952), American football coach and player, politician, and businessman
- Jack Harrison (boxer) (1888–1970), English boxer
- Jack Harrison (VC) (1890–1917), English recipient of the Victoria Cross in the First World War and rugby league player
- Jack Harrison (footballer, born 1900) (1900–1982), Australian rules footballer for Essendon
- Jack Harrison (RAF officer) (1912–2010), Scottish pilot in the Second World War and participant in the Great Escape
- Jack Harrison (Australian footballer) (1915–1989), Australian rules footballer for Melbourne and North Melbourne
- Jack Harrison (footballer, born 1916) (1916–?), English footballer
- Jack Harrison (cricketer) (born 1995), English cricketer
- Jack Harrison (footballer, born 1996), English footballer
- Jack Harrison, character in the British TV series Hotel Babylon

== See also ==
- John Harrison (disambiguation)
