= Robert Nutter =

English Roman Catholic priest and martyr

Blessed Robert Nutter OP
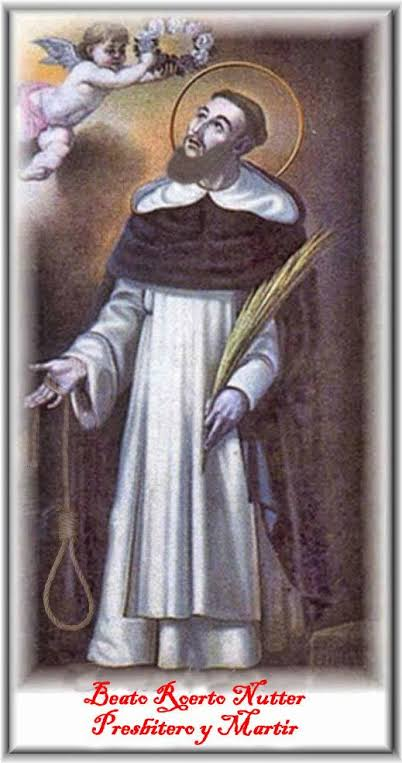

Martyr
- Born: c. 1550; Lancaster, Kingdom of England
- Died: 26 July 1600; Lancaster, Kingdom of England
- Venerated in: Catholic Church
- Beatified: 22 November 1998, Rome by Pope John Paul II
- Feast: 26 July

Robert Nutter (c. 1550 – 26 July 1600) was an English Catholic priest, Dominican friar and martyr. He was beatified in 1987.

== Life ==
Throughout the religious upheavals following the English Reformation, the vast majority of English Catholics, many of whom lived in Lancashire, remained staunchly loyal to the throne.

Nutter was born at Burnley, Lancashire. He entered Brasenose College, Oxford in 1564 or 1565, and, with his brother John Nutter, also a Catholic martyr, became a student of the English College, Reims. He was ordained at Soissons on 21 December 1581 along with Venerable William Dean and George Haydock.

Returning to England, he was committed to the Tower of London, along with his brother, also a priest, on 2 February 1584. He remained in the pit forty-seven days, wearing irons for forty-three days, and twice was subjected to the tortures of "the scavenger's daughter". On 10 November 1584, he was again consigned to the pit. Robert witnessed his older brother's execution before being released. The authorities believed he may unintentionally direct them to Catholic hiding places. He was again arrested and transported to France on 21 January 1585, with twenty other priests and one layman, aboard the Mary Martin of Colchester, from Tower Wharf.

Landing at Boulogne, 2 February, he revisited Rome in July, but, returned then to England as escort to newly ordained priests. When the party was brought ashore at Gravesend, Nutter gave his name as Rowley, but was recognised and on 30 November 1585 again committed to prison in London, this time to Newgate Prison. In 1587 he was removed to the Marshalsea Prison, and thence, in 1590, was sent to Wisbech Castle, Cambridgeshire. While in prison he joined the Dominican Order.

There, in 1597, he signed a petition to Henry Garnet in favour of having a Jesuit superior, but, on November 1598, he and his fellow martyr, Edward Thwing, with others, besought the Pope to institute an archpriest, a request that was later withdrawn. Nutter and Edward Thwing escaped in around 1597, but were eventually recaptured and drawn and quartered after being sent to Lancaster, where both were executed on 26 July 1600.

== Veneration ==
Robert Nutter was beatified by Pope John Paul II in 1987. It was said of Robert Nutter that, "[H]e was a man of a strong body but of a stronger soul, who rather despised and conquered death."

== John Nutter ==
John Nutter attended St John's College, Cambridge. In 1578 the English College at Douai relocated temporarily to Rheims. John and his brother Robert arrived there in August the following year. John was ordained at Laon in September 1582 and left for Yorkshire in November. However, gale winds blew toward the Suffolk coast. John Nutter had contracted an illness before sailing and as it grew worse, he ferried ashore at Dunwich. The ship was subsequently driven on a sandbank and men of the town searched it for anything salvageable. A bundle of Catholic books were found. The ill Nutter was questioned at the inn where he had been taken and acknowledged that he was a priest. He was arrested and taken to the Marshalsea. He remained there a year before being tried and condemned, and shortly thereafter executed at Tyburn, along with James Fenn, George Haydock, Thomas Hemerford, and John Munden.

== See also ==
- Douai Martyrs
