= John Fenn =

John Fenn may refer to:

- John Fenn (antiquarian) (1739–1794), English antiquarian who edited and published the Paston Letters
- John Fenn (chemist) (1917–2010), American co-recipient of the Nobel Prize in Chemistry in 2002
- John Fenn (pirate) (died 1723), English pirate
- John Fenn (priest) (died 1615), English Roman Catholic priest and writer
