= George Harrison (Lord Provost) =

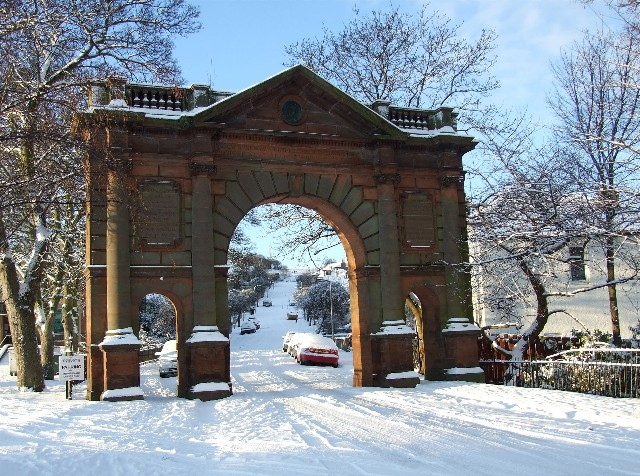
Monumental arch, Observatory Road Monument at the foot of the road leading to Edinburgh University's observation and the Blackford Hill. Erected in 1888 to commemorate 'the work and character' of George Harrison MP 'whose life was devoted to the public good'

Sir George Harrison (1811 – 23 December 1885) was Lord Provost of Edinburgh and a Liberal politician.

== Life ==
Harrison was a merchant of Edinburgh. He established the firm of Harrisons of Edinburgh in 1863.

He was Lord Provost of the city for 1882 to 1885 and was responsible for the acquisition of Blackford Hill by the Corporation of Edinburgh. He was also particularly interested in education. His contributions to social life included providing the land for the Whitehouse and Grange Bowling club in 1872 and acting as president of the Edinburgh Chess Club from 1884 to 1885.

In 1885 Harrison was elected Member of Parliament for Edinburgh South. However he died at the age of 74 within 5 days of the election's closure (18 December), and never took his seat.

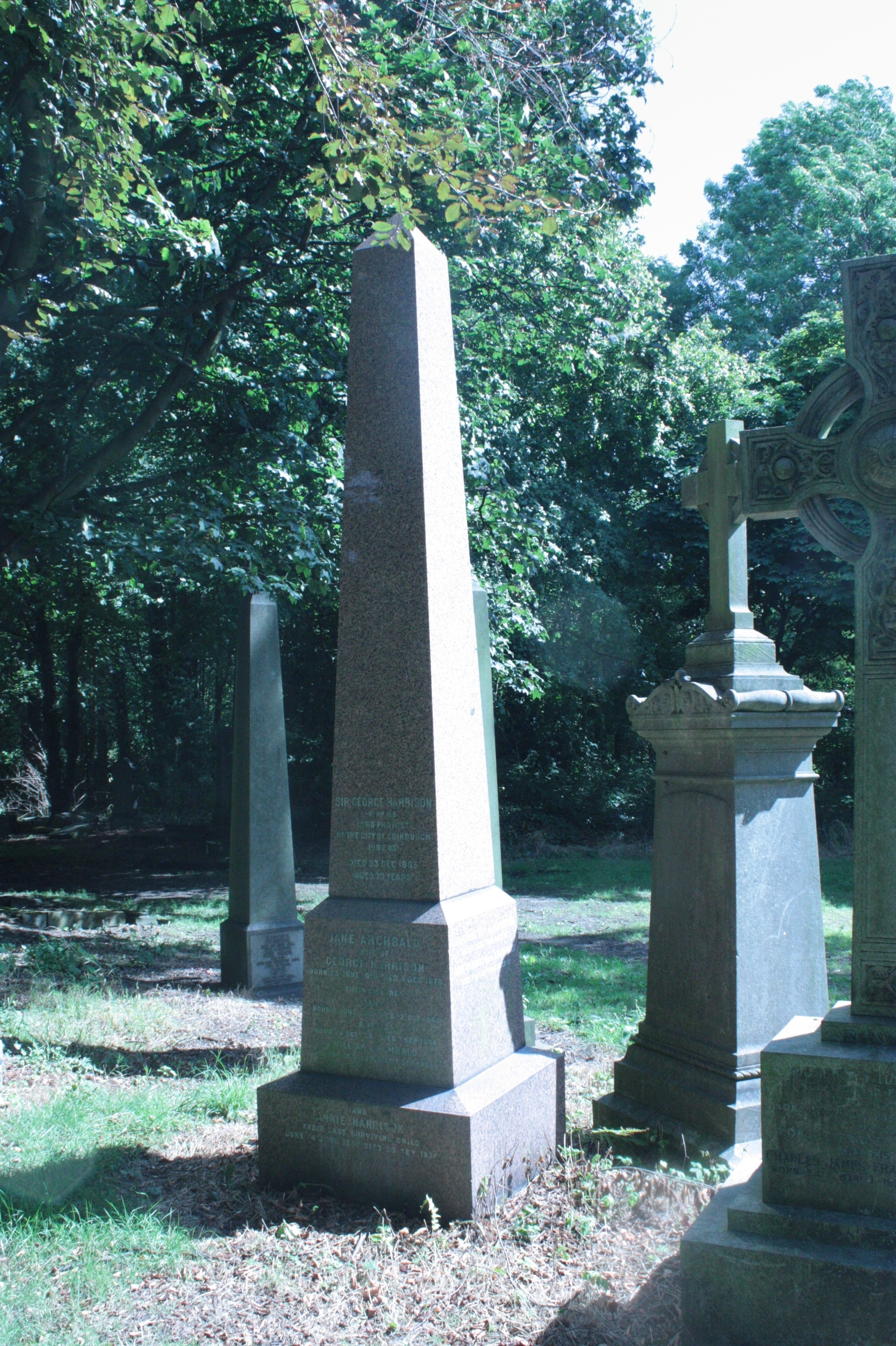
Sir George Harrison's grave, Warriston Cemetery

He lived his final years at 7 Whitehouse Terrace in the Bruntsfield district.

He is buried in Warriston Cemetery just to the south-east of the vaults.

== Recognition ==
Given Sir George's view that statues were inappropriate memorials a group set out to find an alternative means of recognising his life. One proposal was to create a new stained glass window in St Giles Cathedral another was for an arch on Observatory Road at the entrance to Blackford Hill. The latter idea was adopted after a letter from Lord Rosebery, offering his "emphatic adhesion" to the idea, was published in The Scotsman on 2 August 1886. In 1888 the Harrison Arch in Observatory Road was built "to commemorate the work and character of Sir George Harrison". It is a red sandstone triumphal arch. Two streets in Edinburgh — Harrison Road, and Harrison Gardens — were also named after him.

== Family ==
He was married to Jane Archbald (1819–1878). They had several children, including John Harrison FRSE CBE LLD (1847–1922).

Honorary titles
Preceded by Sir Thomas Jamieson Boyd	Lord Provost of Edinburgh; 1882–1885	Succeeded by Sir Thomas Clark, Bt
Parliament of the United Kingdom
New constituency	Member of Parliament for Edinburgh South; November 1885 – December 1885	Succeeded by Hugh Childers
