= The English Schoole-Master =

1596 English dictionary by Edmund Coote

The English Schoole-Maister: Teaching all his schollers, the order of distinct reading, and true writing our English tongue is an English dictionary compiled by Edmund Coote, former Headmaster of King Edward VI School, Bury St Edmunds, and first published in London in 1596. At least 40 editions were published between its first publication and the end of the 17th century.

It went through several editions, with later editions having slightly different subtitles.

The publishing of the book most likely led to him losing his job as headmaster.
