= Charles Jenyns =

English cricketer and clergyman

Personal information
- Full name: Charles Fitzgerald Gambier Jenyns
- Born: 13 November 1827; Bottisham, Cambridgeshire, England
- Died: 26 January 1888 (aged 60); Knebworth, Hertfordshire, England
- Batting: Unknown

Domestic team information
- Years: Team
- 1849–1850: Cambridge University

Career statistics
Competition	First-class
Matches	6
Runs scored	88
Batting average	8.80
100s/50s	–/–
Top score	27
Catches/stumpings	5/–
- Source: Cricinfo, 27 April 2021

Charles Fitzgerald Gambier Jenyns (13 November 1827 – 26 January 1888) was an English first-class cricketer and clergyman.

The son of The Reverend George Jenyns, he was born in November 1827 at Bottisham Hall in Cambridgeshire. He was educated at King Edward VI School, Bury St Edmunds, before going up to Emmanuel College, Cambridge. While studying at Cambridge, he played first-class cricket for Cambridge University Cricket Club from 1849 to 1850, making five appearances. Jenyns has limited success in his five matches for the university, scoring 88 runs with a highest score of 27. His appearance in The University Match against Oxford in 1849 gained him a cricket blue. He also played one first-class match for a combined Cambridge University and Cambridge Town Club team against an All England Eleven at Fenner's in 1849, batting once in the match and being dismissed without scoring by William Martingell.

After graduating from Cambridge, Jenyns took holy orders in the Anglican Church in 1851, when he was ordained as a deacon at Ely Cathedral. His first ecclesiastical post was as curate of Melbourn in Cambridgeshire from 1851 to 1853, before being appointed reverend there in 1853. He held the reverendship at Melbourn until 1874, after which he was reverend of Knebworth in Hertfordshire, a post he held until his death there in January 1888. Jenyns was a keen beekeeper, writing a book on the subject in 1886. He was married twice in his life; firstly to Fanny in 1853, and his secondly to Emily Rose Lytton, in 1856. His maternal grandfather was the diplomat Sir James Gambier, while his paternal grandfather was the priest and landowner George Leonard Jenyns.
