= Octavius Hanbury =

English cricketer (1826–1882)

Personal information
- Full name: Octavius Richard Hanbury
- Born: 16 February 1826; Bath, Somerset, England
- Died: 3 May 1882 (aged 56); Westminster, London, England
- Batting: Unknown
- Bowling: Unknown

Domestic team information
- Years: Team
- 1849: Oxford University

Career statistics
Competition	First-class
Matches	1
Runs scored	12
Batting average	6.00
100s/50s	–/–
Top score	12
Balls bowled	?
Wickets	3
Bowling average	?
5 wickets in innings	–
10 wickets in match	–
Best bowling	2/?
Catches/stumpings	2/–
- Source: Cricinfo, 26 March 2020

Octavius Richard Hanbury (16 February 1826 – 3 May 1882) was an English first-class cricketer.

The son of Octavius Hanbury senior, he was born at Bath in February 1826. He was educated at Rugby School, before going up to Trinity College, Oxford. While studying at Oxford, he made a single appearance in first-class cricket for Oxford University against Cambridge University in The University Match of 1849. Opening the batting in both of Oxford's innings', he was dismissed in their first-innings for 12 runs by Edward Blore, while in their second-innings he was dismissed without scoring by the same bowler. With the ball, he took the wicket of Charles Jenyns in the Cambridge first-innings, while in their second-innings he took the wickets of William Deacon and Jenyns. He later settled on the West Coast of the United States, before returning to England, where he died at Westminster in May 1882.
