= William Mather (cricketer) =

English cricketer and British Army officer

Personal information
- Full name: William Adams Mather
- Born: 1830; Newcastle upon Tyne, Northumberland, England
- Died: 25 May 1864 (aged 33); Marylebone, Middlesex, England
- Batting: Unknown

Domestic team information
- Years: Team
- 1853: Marylebone Cricket Club

Career statistics
Competition	First-class
Matches	1
Runs scored	19
Batting average	9.50
100s/50s	–/–
Top score	15
Catches/stumpings	–/–
- Source: Cricinfo, 15 September 2021

William Adams Mather (1830 – 25 May 1864) was an English first-class cricketer and British Army officer.

The son of William Mather senior, he was born at Newcastle upon Tyne in 1830. He was educated at King Edward VI Grammar School in Bury St Edmunds, before going up to Trinity College, Cambridge. Mather left Cambridge without completing his degree at Cambridge. He played first-class cricket for the Marylebone Cricket Club (MCC) in 1853, making a single appearance against Cambridge University at Fenner's. Batting twice in the match, he was dismissed for 15 runs in the MCC first innings by Ward Maule, while in their second innings he was run out for 4 runs. He was commissioned as a volunteer captain in the 1st Newcastle Newcastle upon Tyne Rifle Volunteers in February 1860, before being promoted to major in April 1863. Mather suffered from ill health in his final years. He died at the Bath Hotel in London on 25 May 1864, aged 33.
