= Leonard Jenyns =

English clergyman and naturalist (1800–1893)

- Born: 25 May 1800; London, England
- Died: 1 September 1893 (aged 93); Bath, England
- Education: St John's College, Cambridge
- Known for: Early phenology records
- Scientific career
- Fields: Natural history

Leonard Jenyns (25 May 1800 – 1 September 1893) was an English clergyman, author and naturalist. He was forced to take on the name Leonard Blomefield to receive an inheritance. He is chiefly remembered for his detailed phenology observations of the times of year at which events in natural history occurred.

== Personal life ==
Jenyns was born in 1800 at No. 85 Pall Mall, London, the home of his maternal grandfather. He was the youngest son of George Leonard Jenyns of Bottisham Hall, Cambridgeshire, a magistrate, landowner and a prebendary of Ely Cathedral. His mother Mary (1763–1832) was the daughter of William Heberden (1710–1801). His father had inherited the Bottisham Hall property on the death of his distant cousin Soame Jenyns (1704–1787).

By 1812, Jenyns began to study natural history encouraged by his great uncle. He went to Eton in 1813 where he read, and was inspired by Gilbert White's Natural History of Selborne. In 1817 Jenyns was introduced to Sir Joseph Banks as "the Eton boy who lit his rooms with gas".

Jenyns went to St. John's College Cambridge in 1818 and during his second year, his interest in natural history was noticed by John Stevens Henslow (1796–1861), and they subsequently worked together until Henslow's death. Henslow had married Jenyns's sister Harriet in 1823. Jenyns graduated in 1822.

Jenyns was a founder member of the Ray Society and a noted parson-naturalist. He wrote a biography of John Stevens Henslow, who was his – and Charles Darwin's – mentor.

He was ordained in May 1823, becoming the curate of Swaffham Bulbeck in Cambridgeshire in December 1827. He married Jane Daubeny, (a vicar's daughter and niece of Professor Charles Daubeny) of Ampney Crucis, Gloucestershire, in 1844. In 1849, Jenyns and his wife moved to Ventnor, Isle of Wight and then in 1850 to a house near Bath due to her ill-health. In 1852, he became vicar of the parishes of Langridge and Woolley.

His wife died in 1860, and in 1862 he was married for the second time to Sarah Hawthorn (another vicar's daughter). In 1871, Jenyns inherited 140 acres of land in Norfolk from his father's cousin, Francis Blomefield, but Jenyns had to change his name to Blomefield by Royal Licence as a condition of the inheritance. He died in Bath on 1 September 1893 and was buried at Landsdown Cemetery, Bath.

== Jenyns and HMS Beagle ==
Jenyns was the original choice for the naturalist on the second voyage of HMS Beagle but turned down the offer due to ill health and parish duties. His diary entry for 1831 records

This year I had the offer of accompanying Capt. Fitzroy, as Naturalist, in the Beagle, on his voyage to survey the coasts of S.America, afterwards going round the globe:- declined the appointment wc was afterwards given to Charles Darwin Esq. of Xts' College Cambridge".

— Leonard Jenyns

Jenyns suggested Charles Darwin as his replacement, and they maintained a correspondence. He subsequently became the editor of volume 4, Fish in Darwin's The zoology of the voyage of H.M.S. Beagle, under the command of Captain Fitzroy, R.N., during the years 1832–1836

== Membership of Learned Societies ==
In 1822, Jenyns became a member of the Linnean Society. In 1825 Jenyns gave his first paper on the "Ornithology of Cambridgeshire" to the Cambridge Philosophical Society, where he became a member and then a fellow. In 1855 he founded and became President of the Bath Natural History and Antiquarian Field Club. In Cambridge, he set up the Societies Museum, now the Cambridge University Museum of Zoology. His large insect collection was donated to the Cambridge Philosophical Society, and in 1869 his library of about 1200 volumes, his herbarium of British plants, and four volumes of letters were presented to the Bath Royal Literary and Scientific Institution.

Jenyns was a founding member of the Zoological Society of London. He joined the British Association for the Advancement of Science in 1832, and became a member of the Society of Entomologists of London in 1834 and the Geological Society of London in 1835. In 1892 he was honoured with a congratulatory letter by the Linnean Society, where he had been a member for seventy years.

== Archives at the Cambridge University Museum of Zoology ==
Jenyns made many natural history observations in phenology in Cambridgeshire. Jenyns created a hand-written manuscript of these observations, entitled Contributions towards a Fauna Cantabrigiensis, published in 2012. The modern publication updates the nomenclature and provides a historical context for Jenyns's phenological observations which were made between c. 1820 and 1849. The museum archives contain extensive material from Jenyns, including manuscripts and books on local natural history.

== Works ==
Jenyns's works include:

- Jenyns, Leonard (1831). A monograph on the British species of Cyclas and Pisidium. Trans. Camb. Phil. Soc., Vol. 4 pp. 289–311.
- Jenyns, Leonard (1842). Fish. In C. Darwin (ed.) The zoology of the voyage of H.M.S. Beagle, under the command of Captain Fitzroy, R.N., during the years 1832–1836. Smith, Elder & Co., London (in 4 parts): p. 1–32 (Jan. 1840); 33–64 (Jun. 1840); 65-96 (Apr. 1841); 97–172 (1842).
- Jenyns, Leonard (1862). Memoir of the Rev. John Stevens Henslow. John Van Voorst.

== See also ==
- Category:Taxa named by Leonard Jenyns
