= George Henslow =

Anglican curate, botanist, and author

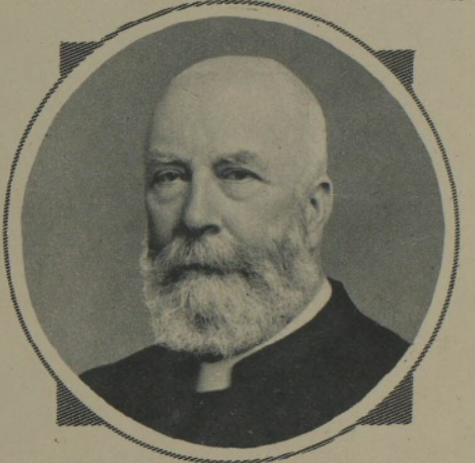
- Born: 23 March 1835; Cambridge, England
- Died: 30 December 1925 (aged 90); Bournemouth, England
- Occupations: Botanist, writer

George Henslow (23 March 1835 – 30 December 1925) was an Anglican curate, botanist and author. Henslow was notable for being a defender of Lamarckian evolution.

== Biography ==
The third son of Rev. John Stevens Henslow, George Henslow was educated at King Edward VI School, Bury St Edmunds and then matriculated on 30 May 1854 at Christ's College, Cambridge, where he graduated B.A. 1858 and M.A. 1861. He was ordained in the Church of England a deacon in 1859 and a priest in 1861. In 1864, he became a Fellow of the Linnean Society. He was the headmaster from 1861 to 1864 of Hampton Lucy Grammar School and from 1865 to 1872 of the Grammar School, Store Street, London. From 1868 to 1880, he was Lecturer in Botany at St Bartholomew's Hospital and also at Birkbeck College and Queen's College, London. He was from 1868 to 1870 Curate of St John's Wood Chapel and from 1870 to 1887 Curate of St James's, Marylebone. He resided at Ealing, where he was from 1882 to 1904 President of the Ealing Microscopical and Natural History Society, then resided at Drayton House in Learnington and finally at Bournemouth. On 26 October 1897, he was among the first 60 medallists of the Victoria Medal of Honour awarded by the Royal Horticultural Society.

George took orders and became Honorary Professor of the Royal Horticultural Society. He was a prolific author and speaker on botanical subjects; the separates from current publications between 1871–1915 occupy eleven bound volumes in the Linnean Library, indexed in his own hand, and interleaved with interesting MS letters from his correspondents. George Henslow believed in the inheritance of acquired characters in plants, and combated the newly recognised work of August Weismann.

He married in Cambridge on 13 October 1859 to Ellen Weekley (c. 1836–1875) but they divorced on 8 July 1872. In St Pancras, London in the 4th registration quarter of 1872, he married Georgina Brook Bailey (1843–1876), daughter of John Hopkins Bailey, clergyman, and his wife Caroline Mary of Wickford, Essex. In 1881, he married his third wife Katharine Yeo (c. 1845–1919, née Forster), the widow of Reverend Richard Yeo of Ealing. George Henslow's third wife brought step-children to his third marriage but bore no more children. There were five children from his first marriage but only one, George Stevens Henslow (1863–1924), survived to adulthood. Henslow died on 30 December 1925 in Bournemouth.

In his later years, he became a believer in spiritualism.

== Evolution ==
Henslow was a proponent of theistic evolution who held that "natural selection plays no part in the origin of species." He promoted his Lamarckian theory of evolution in plants by direct adaptation, known as "the True Darwinism". He used this term in opposition to Neo-Darwinism, which denied the inheritance of acquired characteristics.

== Selected publications ==
The standard author abbreviation G.Hensl. is used to indicate this person as the author when citing a botanical name.

=== Articles ===
- Henslow, George (1866). "Note on the Structure of Medicago sativa, as apparently affording facilities for the intercrossing of distinct flowers". Journal of the Linnean Society of London, Botany. 9 (38): 327–329. doi:10.1111/j.1095-8339.1866.tb01291.x.
- "On the self-fertilization of plants". Trans. Linn. Soc. Lond. Series 2. Botany. 1: 317–398. 1877.
- Henslow, George (1879). "On the Absorption of Rain and Dew by the Green Parts of Plants". Journal of the Linnean Society of London, Botany. 17 (101): 313–327. doi:10.1111/j.1095-8339.1879.tb01235.x.
- Henslow, George (24 October 1889). "Yew trees in Berks". Nature. 40 (1043): 621. doi:10.1038/040621a0. S2CID 4029467.
- Henslow, George (1892). "Egyptian figs". Nature. 47 (1205): 102. doi:10.1038/047102b0. S2CID 4020290.
- Henslow, George (1894). "The Origin of Plant-Structures by Self-Adaptation to the Environment, exemplified by Desert or Xerophilous Plants". Journal of the Linnean Society of London, Botany. 30 (208): 218–263. doi:10.1111/j.1095-8339.1894.tb02409.x.
- Henslow, G. (1907). "On the Xerophytic Characters of certain Coal-plants, and a Suggested Origin of Coal-Beds". Quarterly Journal of the Geological Society. 63 (1–4): 282–293. doi:10.1144/GSL.JGS.1907.063.01-04.17. S2CID 129243838.
- "The True Darwinism". Journal of the Royal Horticultural Society. 33: 1–7. 1907.

=== Books ===
- Theory of evolution of living things and the application of the principles of evolution to religion. Macmillan and Co. 1873.
- Christian beliefs reconsidered in the light of modern thought. F. Norgate; etc., etc. 1884.
- Origin of floral structures through insects and other agencies. International scientific series, v. 64. K. Paul, Trench, Trübnerco. 1888.
- Making of flowers. 1891.
- The origin of plant structures by self-adaptation to the environment. K. Paul, Trench, Trübner, & co. 1895.
- The plants of the Bible. Present day primers. The Religious Tract Society. 1895.
- Christ, no product of evolution. G. Stoneman. 1896.
- Medical works of the fourteenth century, together with a list of plants recorded in contemporary writings, with their identifications. 1899.
- Poisonous plants in field and garden. Society for Promoting Christian Knowledge. 1901.
- The story of wild llowers. G. Newnes. 1901.
- Present-day Rationalism: Critically Examined. Cincinnati, Jennings and Graham. 1905.
- South African flowering plants: for the use of beginners, students and teachers. Longmans, Green, and Co. 1903.
- The uses of British plants traced from antiquity to the present day, together with the derivations of their names. Lovell, Reeve & Co. 1905.
- Plants of the Bible: their ancient and mediæval history popularly described. 1906.
- The spiritual teachings of Christ's life. Williams & Norgate. 1906.
- Henslow, George (1907). Introduction to plant ecology, for the uses of teachers and students.
- The heredity of acquired characters in plants. J. Murray. 1908.
- The origin and history of our garden vegetables, to which is added their dietetic values. Pub. for the Author by the Royal Horticultural Society. 1912.
- Proofs of the truths of spiritualism. 1919.
- Prof. Henslows Botany For Beginners. 1901.
