= Jack Harrison (cricketer) =

English cricketer (born 1995)

Personal information
- Full name: Jack Harrison
- Born: 4 October 1995 (age 31); Leeds, Yorkshire, England
- Batting: Right-handed
- Role: Wicket-keeper

Domestic team information
- Years: Team
- 2017: Oxford University

Career statistics
Competition	First-class
Matches	1
Runs scored	52
Batting average	26.00
100s/50s	–/–
Top score	38
Catches/stumpings	5/1
- Source: Cricinfo, 5 May 2020

Jack Harrison (born 4 October 1995) is an English former first-class cricketer.

Harrison was born at Leeds. He was educated at The Grammar School at Leeds, before going up to Pembroke College, Oxford where he read economics and management. While studying at Oxford, he made a single appearance in first-class cricket for Oxford University against Cambridge University in The University Match of 2017 at Fenner's. Playing as a wicket-keeper, he batted twice in the match and was dismissed for 38 runs in the Oxford first innings by James Poulson by a ball that commentators described as "unplayable", while in their second innings he was dismissed for 14 runs by Ruari Crichard. Behind the stumps he took five catches and made a single stumping.
