= William Dean (priest) =

English Roman Catholic priest and martyr

Blessed
- Born: Grassington, West Riding of Yorkshire, England
- Died: 28 August 1588; Mile End, London, England
- Venerated in: Roman Catholic Church
- Beatified: 15 December 1929 by Pope Pius XI

William Dean or Deane (died 28 August 1588) was an English Roman Catholic priest. He is one of the Catholic martyrs, beatified in 1929.

== Life ==
Son of Thomas B. of Grassington West Riding of Yorkshire William Dean attended schools in Leeds and Clitheroe.

Dean was matriculated sizar from Magdalene College, Cambridge in 1575 and was admitted pensioner at Caius College, Cambridge in November 1577, aged 20. He then became a minister. In 1581, he was reconciled to the Catholic faith by the seminary priest Thomas Alfield.

That same year he studied at the English College, Reims and was ordained priest at Soissons, 21 December 1581, together with the martyrs George Haydock and Robert Nutter. Their ordination coincided with the news of Edmund Campion's death reaching the college.

Dean said his first Mass on 9 January 1582 and left for England 25 January. He was arrested 21 February and sent to Newgate prison and subjected to torture. In April 1584 he was moved to The Clink. He was banished with a number of other priests in early 1585, put ashore on the coast of Normandy, and threatened with death if he returned to England.

Nevertheless, in November he returned to his mission work and was again arrested and confined to Gatehouse Prison. He was tried and condemned for his priesthood on 22 August 1588. Dean, who had been condemned with five other priests and four laymen, was the first to suffer on the gallows recently erected at Mile End. With him died a layman, Henry Webley, for relieving and assisting him.

At his execution Dean tried to speak to the people, but he was struck on the head and gagged.

== Henry Webley ==
Henry Webley was born in Gloucester around 1558. From there he went to London, where he assisted William Dean during the priest's brief mission in the city. By 1586, the ports were being closely watched by both government officials and government spies. In April of that year, Webley was seized on board a ship at Chichester bound for France and sent to the Marshalsea, where he remained for two years. His crimes included being reconciled to the Catholic religion, making his confession to Dean, and aiding and assisting the priest. His trial was held in the latter part of August 1588 at the Old Bailey, but appears to have been merely a formality since those sent for trial were those selected for execution. Webley was hanged, along with Dean, at Mile End Green on 28 August 1588.

Edward Shelley

Blessed
- Born: c.1530 Warminghurst, Sussex, England
- Died: 30 August 1588; Tyburn, London, England
- Venerated in: Roman Catholic Church
- Beatified: 15 December 1929 by Pope Pius XI
- Feast: 30 August

== Edward Shelley ==
Edward Shelley of Warminghurst, Sussex, and East Smithfield, London (son of Edward Shelley, of Warminghurst, a Master of the Household of the sovereign, and the settlor in "Shelley's case", and Joan, daughter of Paul Eden, of Penshurst, Kent). His grandfather was Sir John Shelley of Michelgrove near Arundel. He was apparently uncle by marriage to Benjamin Norton, afterwards one of the seven vicars of Dr. Richard Smith.

Aged 50 or 60, Shelley was already in The Clink for his religion in April, 1584. He was condemned for keeping a book called My Lord Leicester's Commonwealth and for having assisted William Dean. He was hanged at Tyburn 30 August 1588.
