= James Poulson =

English cricketer

Personal information
- Full name: James Edward Poulson
- Born: 20 February 1995 (age 31); Bury St Edmunds, Suffolk, England
- Batting: Right-handed
- Bowling: Right-arm medium

Domestic team information
- Years: Team
- 2012–2019: Suffolk
- 2014: Oxford MCCU
- 2017: Cambridge University

Career statistics
Competition	First-class
Matches	2
Runs scored	61
Batting average	61.00
100s/50s	–/–
Top score	40
Balls bowled	287
Wickets	5
Bowling average	26.60
5 wickets in innings	–
10 wickets in match	–
Best bowling	3/30
Catches/stumpings	–/–
- Source: Cricinfo, 12 July 2019

James Edward Poulson (born 20 February 1995) is an English former first-class cricketer.

Poulson was born at Bury St Edmunds. He was educated in Bury St Edmunds at the King Edward VI School, before going up to Oxford Brookes University. While studying at Oxford Brookes, he made a single appearance in first-class cricket for Oxford MCCU against Warwickshire at Oxford in 2014. He later undertook postgraduate studies at Homerton College, Cambridge. While studying at Cambridge, he made a single first-class appearance for Cambridge University against Oxford University at Fenner's in 2017. He scored 61 runs in his two matches, with a high score of 40. With his right-arm medium pace bowling he took 5 wickets at an average of 26.60, with best figures of 3 for 30. In addition to playing first-class cricket, Poulson also played minor counties cricket for Suffolk from 2012–19 making seventeen appearances in the Minor Counties Championship, fourteen appearances in the MCCA Knockout Trophy, and sixteen appearances in the Minor Counties T20.
