= James Fenn =

English Catholic priest and martyr

Blessed James Fenn
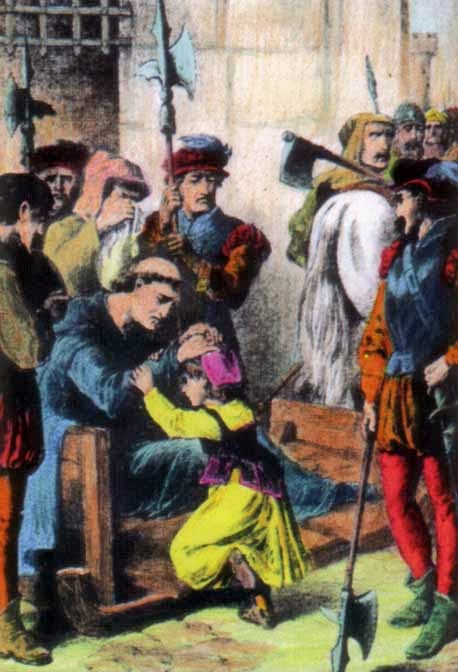

Martyr
- Born: c. 1540; Montacute, Somersetshire
- Died: 12 February 1584; Tyburn, London, England
- Honored in: Catholic Church
- Beatified: 15 December 1929 by Pope Pius XI
- Feast: 12 February
- Influences: John Fenn

James Fenn (c. 1540 – 12 February 1584) was an English Catholic priest and martyr who was beatified on 15 December 1929, by Pope Pius XI. James Fenn was the brother of the Catholic priest and writer John Fenn and of Robert Fenn. All three brothers were choristers and scholars.

Before becoming a priest at around the age of 40, Fenn married and fathered a son and daughter and became a widower. He was executed for his loyalty to the Catholic Church which was contrary to the demand to recognize supremacy of the crown in the Church of England.

== Life ==
Born about 1540 in Montacute, Somersetshire, Fenn became a chorister in 1544 at the New College, Oxford, where his singing won him a place at Corpus Christi College. Although eligible for a Bachelor's degree in November 1558, he refused to take the Oath of Supremacy that would swear allegiance to the monarch Queen Elizabeth I as Supreme Governor of the Church of England. As insistence on the oath at that time would have affected the status of the majority of the Fellows and most of the Heads of Colleges, the requirement was temporarily suspended by the Privy council for candidates of degrees at the University of Oxford. Fenn took his degree on 22 November 1559, but he was expelled and his degree was revoked a year later in November 1560. He remained a while longer at the university and became a tutor to students at Gloucester Hall, but deciding that it was no longer safe for him there withdrew to Somersetshire.

There he became a tutor, married, and had children. While visiting his father in Wells, Bishop Gilbert Berkeley had him arrested for again refusing to take the oath, but released him when it was pointed out that there had been no occasion for exacting it. His father had given him the house in Montacute and he moved there with his family. The local vicar wanted him charged under the Act of Uniformity for not attending services. On advice of a relative, he went into hiding for two months, during which his wife died. Making provision for his children, he left the area and took a job as agent for Sir Nicholas Poynta of Gloucestershire.

While there he met a priest, probably John Colleton, who suggested Fenn consider the priesthood. Fenn left for Rheims in 1579 and was ordained at Châlons in April 1580. He returned to Somersetshire the following month, where he worked unmolested for over a year. In July 1581, Edmund Campion and Father Colloton were arrested at Lyford Grange, along with some prominent people of Somersetshire. In the general excitement this caused, Fenn was arrested as a suspected recusant and eventually wound up at the Marshalsea. Given relative freedom, Fenn ministered to the other prisoners for about two years before he was recognized, possibly by the spy Thomas Dodwell.

On 7 February 1584, Fenn and George Haydock (whom Fenn had only met the day before in the dock) were tried and convicted of conspiracy and sedition, among other charges. Fenn was executed at Tyburn on 12 February 1584, along with George Haydock, John Munden, John Nutter and Thomas Hemerford. Noticing his daughter Frances in the crowd, he attempted to bless her as well as his pinioned hands would allow. His head was mounted on London Bridge and his quarters displayed above the four main gates of London.

== Beatification ==
James Fenn was beatified on 15 December 1929 by Pope Pius XI. He is commemorated on 12 February.

== See also ==
- Catholic Church in the United Kingdom
- Douai Martyrs
