= Lynching of John Harrison =

1922 lynching in Arkansas

- Part of Jim Crow Era
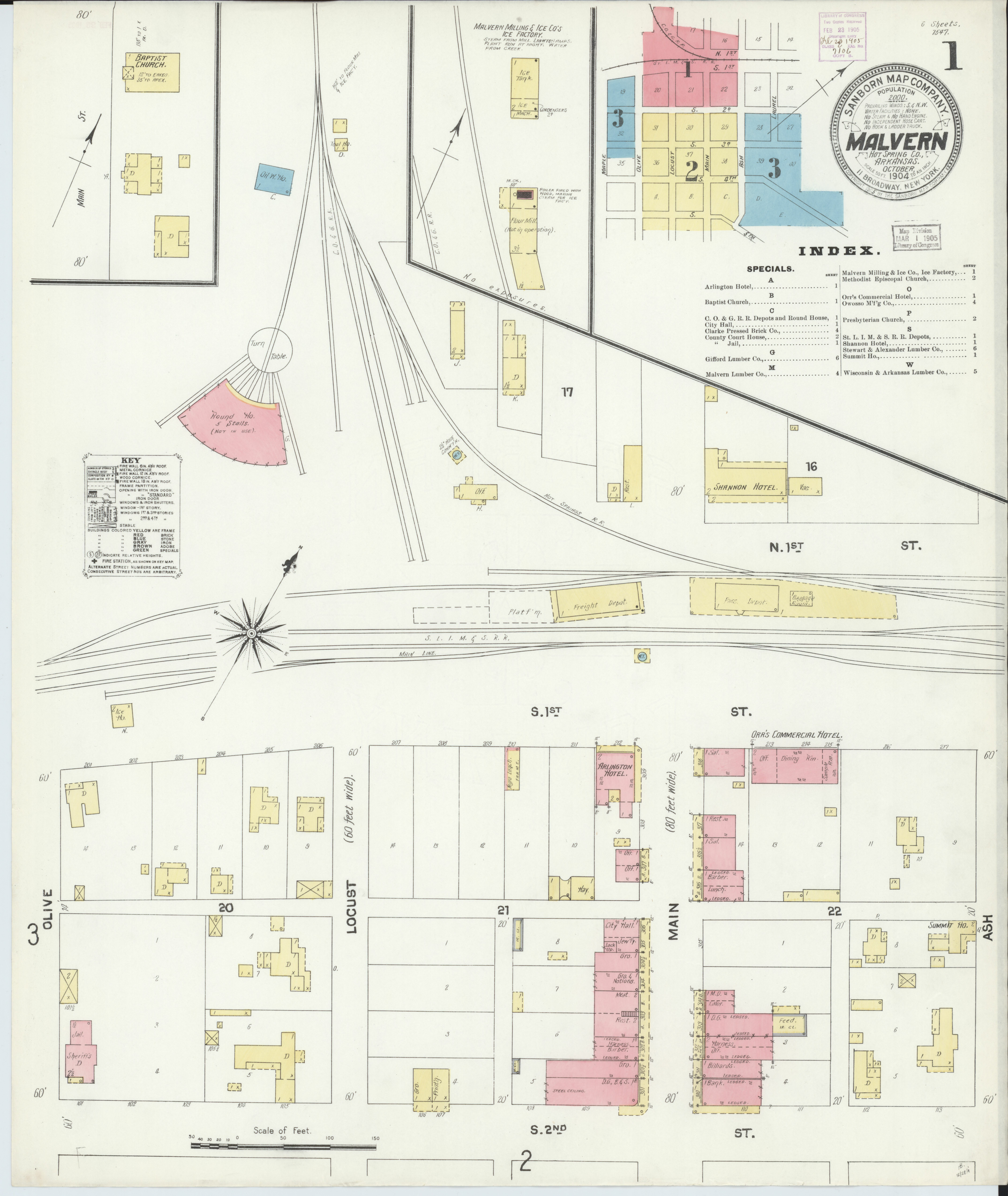
- Map from Malvern, Hot Spring County, Arkansas, showing the train station where he was lynched
- Date: February 2, 1922
- Location: Malvern, Hot Spring County, Arkansas
- Participants: A masked mob of around twenty men
- Deaths: John Henry Harrison

John Henry Harrison (also referred to as Harry Harrison and John Harris) was a 38-year-old African-American man who was lynched in Malvern, Hot Spring County, Arkansas, by masked men on February 2, 1922. According to the United States Senate Committee on the Judiciary it was the 10th of 61 lynchings in America and 1 of 5 lynchings in the State of Arkansas during 1922.

== Background ==
According to the 1920 census John Harrison was thirty-eight years old, married, and worked as a laborer in a Malvern lumber mill. In 1917, when he registered for the military draft, he was living at 405 Vine Street in Malvern. In early 1922 he began to show troubling behavior including stalking and threatening women. One of these woman reported his actions to Hot Spring County, Arkansas Sheriff Donald F. Bray who arrested Harrison in February 1922.

== Lynching ==
Word of his arrest and that he was harassing white women spread and a mob quickly gathered on the evening of February 2, 1922. Sheriff Bray, fearing a lynching, tried to spirit Harrison out of the town by road to Arkadelphia, Arkansas, but found all roads blocked. He then tried to smuggle him out by train hiding him under a seat in the segregated "colored" section of the train around 10:30 PM. Just before the train could leave, a group of around 20 men stopped the train and went from car to car searching for Harrison. He was discovered, dragged a short distance away, and shot at least seventeen times.

== Aftermath ==
In 1923 John Henry Harrison's sister, Callie Henry, tried to sue Sheriff D. S. Bray, deputies W. T. Gamble and S. H. Leiper, and W. H. Cooper for his death while in their custody as well as alleged leaders of the mob, including Clarence Chamberlain, R. S. Hodges, Leonard Stanley, and Ray Galina, but the courts ruled against her the following year.

== National memorial ==
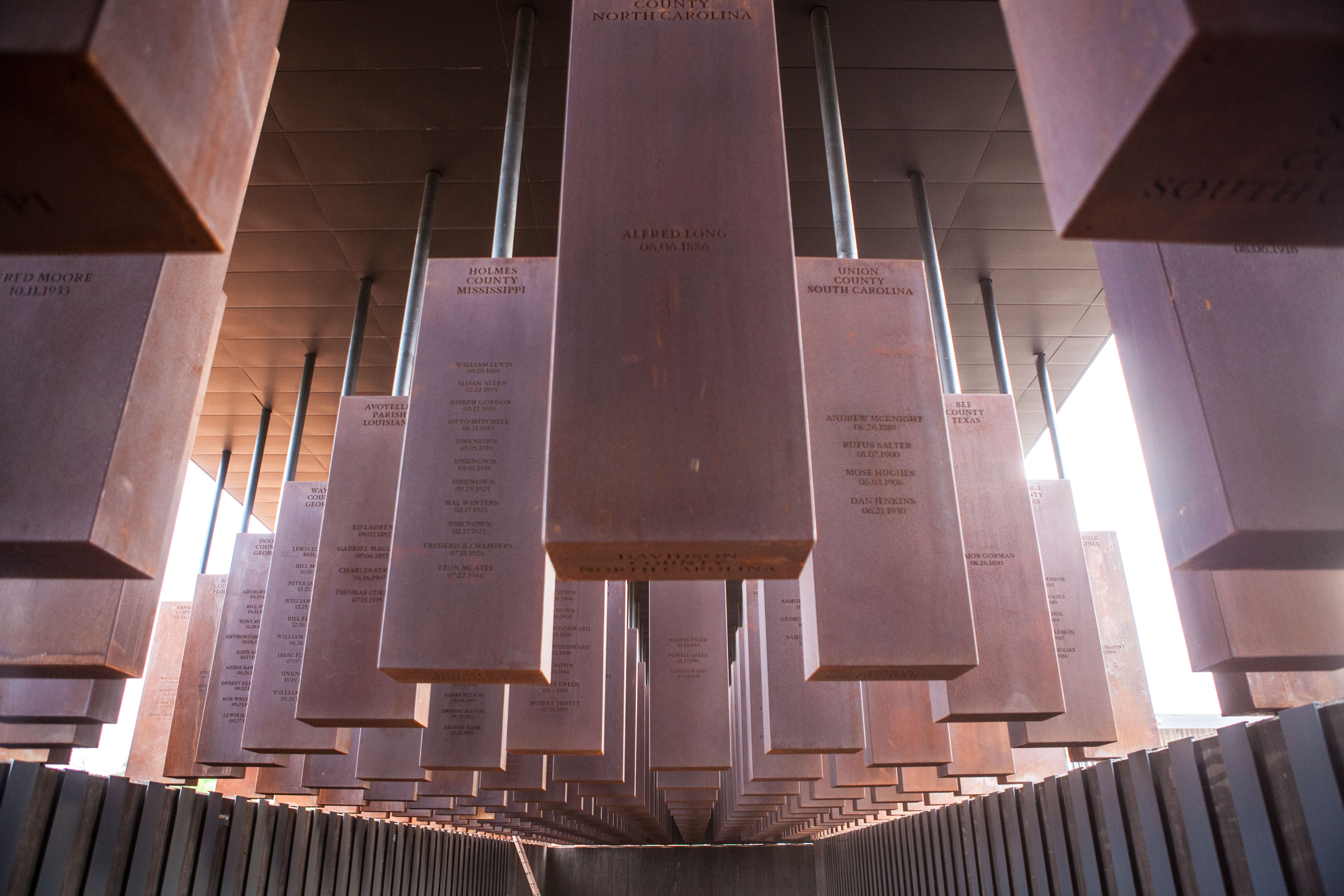
Memorial Corridor, National Memorial for Peace and Justice

The National Memorial for Peace and Justice opened in Montgomery, Alabama, on April 26, 2018. Featured among other things is the Memorial Corridor which displays 805 hanging steel rectangles, each representing the counties in the United States where a documented lynching took place and, for each county, the names of those lynched. The memorial hopes that communities, like Hot Spring County, Arkansas where Mr. Norman was lynched, will take these slabs and install them in their own communities. On May 22 a historical marker was erected in Malvern along with ceremonies and many guest speakers to commemorate the marker.

== See also ==
- Mr. Norman was an African-American man who was lynched in Texarkana, Miller County, Arkansas by masked men on February 11, 1922
- John West was a 50-year-old African-American man who was lynched in Guernsey, Hempstead County, Arkansas by a group of men on the Hope-Texarkana train on July 28, 1922.
- Gilbert Harris was lynched on August 1, 1922, in Hot Springs, Arkansas. A white mob some 500 strong broke into the jail seized Gilbert Harris after overpowering the police in the public square (actually a triangle shape in front of the Como hotel). Even though Harris had a history of break and enters he professed his innocence.
- Less Smith was lynched in Morrilton, Conway County, Arkansas on December 9, 1922. Deputy sheriff Granville Edward Farish was trying to collect a debt from Smith when a scuffle broke out. In the fight, Farish smashed a bottle over Smith's head whereupon Smith shot him in the stomach. Smith was arrested and a white mob soon gathered. When officials tried to move Smith to another jail he was seized, hanged from a tree and his body riddled with bullets. When the body was taken to the undertaker the mob burst in to view the body.

Number	Name	Date	Place	Method of lynching	Number of victims
1	Bill McAllister	January 8, 1922	Williamsburg, S.C.	Shot	1
2	Lincoln Hickson	January 8, 1922	Williamsburg, S.C.	Shot	1
3	Willie Jenkins	January 10, 1922	Eufaula, Alabama	Shot	1
4	Jake Brooks	January 14, 1922	Oklahoma City, Oklahoma	Hanged	1
5	Charles Strong	January 17, 1922	Mayo, Florida	Hanged	1
6	Will Bell	January 29, 1922	Pontotoc, Mississippi	Shot	1
7	Unidentified	January 29, 1922	Pontotoc, Mississippi	Shot	
8	Drew Conner (White)	January 28, 1922	Bolinger, Alabama	Burned	1
9	Will Thrasher	February 1, 1922	Crystal Springs, Mississippi	Hanged	1
10	Harry Harrison	February 2, 1922	Malvern, Arkansas	Shot	1
11	Manuel Duarte	February 2, 1922	Cameron County, Texas	Shot	1
12	P. Norman	February 11, 1922	Texarkana, Arkansas	Shot	1
13	Will Jones	February 13, 1922	Ellaville, Georgia	Shot	1
14	William Baker	March 8, 1922	Aberdeen, Mississippi	Hanged	1
15	Alfred Williams	March 12, 1922	Harlem, Georgia	Hanged	1
16	Brown Culpepper (White)	March 13, 1922	Holly Grove, Louisiana	Shot	1
17	Jerry Ingram	March 17, 1922	Crawford, Mississippi	Shot	1
18	Unidentified (white)	March 19, 1922	Okay, Oklahoma	Drowned	1
19	Alexander Smith	March 22, 1922	Gulfport, Mississippi	Hanged	1
20	Snap Curry	May 6, 1922	Kirvin, Texas	Burned	1
21	H. Varney (or Johnnie Cornish)	May 6, 1922	Kirvin, Texas	Burned	1
22	Mose Jones	May 6, 1922	Kirvin, Texas	Burned	1
23	Tom Cornish	May 8, 1922	Kirvin, Texas	Hanged	1
24	Thomas Early	May 17, 1922	Conroe, Texas	Burned	1
25	Charles Atkins	May 18, 1922	Davisboro, Georgia	Burned	1
26	Hullen Owens	May 19, 1922	Texarkana, Texas	Hanged (body burned)	1
27	Joe Winters	May 20, 1922	Conroe, Texas	Burned	1
28	Mose Bozier	May 20, 1922	Alleyton, Texas	Hanged	1
29	Gilbert Wilson	May 23, 1922	Bryan, Texas	Beaten to death	1
30	Jesse Thomas	May 26, 1922	Waco, Texas	Shot (body burned)	1
31	William Byrd	May 28, 1922	Brentwood, Georgia	Shot (body burned)	1
32	Robert Collins	June 20, 1922	Summit, Mississippi	Hanged	1
33	Warren Lewis	June 23, 1922	New Dacus, Texas	Hanged	1
34	James Harvey	July 1, 1922	Lanes Bridge, Georgia	Hanged	1
35	Joe Jordan	July 1, 1922	Lanes Bridge, Georgia	Hanged	1
36	Philip Tankard	July 5, 1922	Belhaven, North Carolina	Shot	1
37	Joe Pemberton	July 7, 1922	Benton, Louisiana	Hanged	1
38	Jake "Shake" Davis	July 14, 1922	Miller County, Georgia	Hanged	1
39	Oscar Mack	July 18, 1922	Orange County, Florida	Hanged (False report, Oscar Mack survived)	1
40	Will Anderson	July 24, 1922	Allentown, Georgia	Shot	1
41	John West	July 28, 1922	Guernsey, Arkansas	Shot	1
42	Gilbert Harris	August 1, 1922	Hot Springs, Arkansas	Hanged	1
43	John Glover	August 1, 1922	Holton,	Shot	1
44	Bayner Blackwell	August 6, 1922	Swansboro, North Carolina	Shot	1
45	John Steelman	August 23, 1922	Lambert, Mississippi	Burned	1
46	Thomas Rivers	August 30, 1922	Bossier Parish, Louisiana	Hanged	1
47	F. Watt Daniels (White)	August 1922	Mer Rouge, Louisiana	Ku-Klux Klan	1
48	Thomas F. Richards (White)	August 1922	Mer Rouge, Louisiana	Ku-Klux Klan	1
49	Jim Reed Long	September 2, 1922	Winder, Georgia	Ku-Klux Klan	1
50	O.J. Johnson	September 7, 1922	Newton, Texas	Hanged	1
51	Jim Johnston	September 28, 1922	Sandersville, Georgia	Hanged	1
52	Grover C. Everett	September 28, 1922	Abilene, Texas	Shot	1
53	John Brown	October 3, 1922	Montgomery, Alabama	Shot	1
54	Ed Hartley (white)	October 20, 1922	Camden, Tennessee	Shot	1
55	George Hartley (white)	October 20, 1922	Camden, Tennessee	Shot	1
56	Elias V. Zarate	November 11, 1922	Weslaco, Texas	Shot	1
57	Cupid Dickson / Cubrit Dixon	December 5, 1922	Madison, Florida	Shot	1
58	Charles Wright	December 8 ,1922	Perry, Florida	Burned	1
59	Less Smith	December 9, 1922	Morrilton, Arkansas	Burned	1
60	George Gay	December 11, 1922	Streetman, Texas	Hanged	1
61	Arthur Young	December 11, 1922	Perry, Florida	Hanged	1
