= John Harrison (footballer, born 1961) =

English footballer

Personal information
- Full name: John James Harrison
- Date of birth: 7 June 1961 (age 65)
- Place of birth: York, England
- Height: 5 ft 9 in (1.75 m)
- Position: Defender

Senior career*
Years	Team	Apps	(Gls)
- Leeman United
- Osbaldwick
1977–1980	York City	8	(0)
- Osbaldwick
- * Club domestic league appearances and goals

John James Harrison (born 7 June 1961) is an English former professional footballer who played as a defender in the Football League for York City, and in non-League football for Leeman United and Osbaldwick.
