= John Harrison (historian) =

Scottish merchant, master tailor and historical author (1847– 1922)

John Harrison CBE LLD (17 August 1847–10 July 1922) was a Scottish merchant, master tailor and historical author. He was Master of the Edinburgh Merchant Company and Chairman of the Edinburgh Chamber of Commerce.

== Life ==
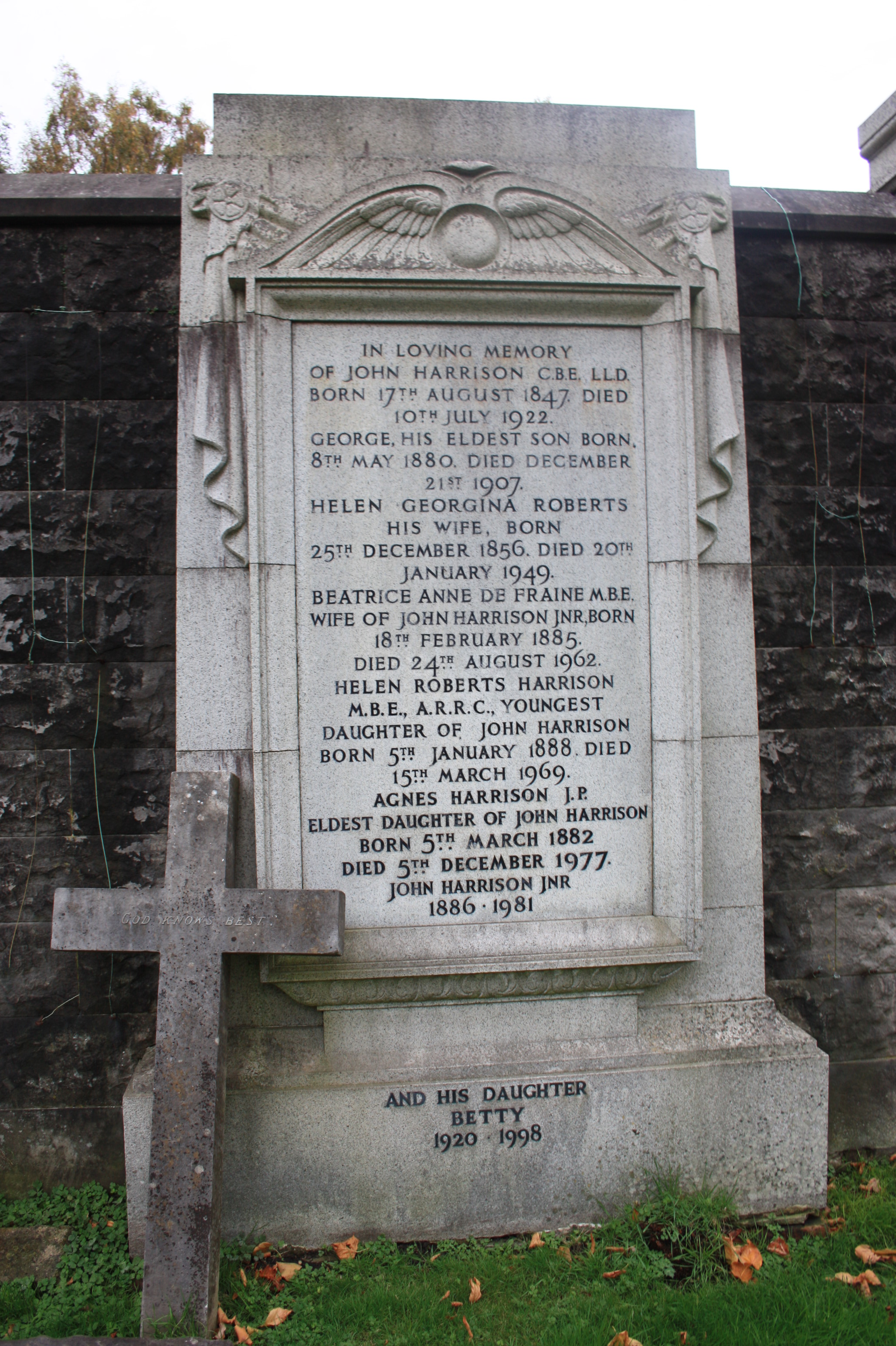
The grave of John Harrison, Dean Cemetery, Edinburgh

He was born at 19 St Patrick Square in Edinburgh on 17 August 1847 the son of Jane Archbald and George Harrison a prominent merchant and later Lord Provost of Edinburgh and owner of Harrison and Sons, a high quality clothier. He was educated at the High School in Edinburgh.

His most famous work, The Scot in Ulster, was originally published in sections in the Scotsman newspaper.

He lived at "Rockville" on Napier Road in Edinburgh, the masterpiece by Edinburgh architect Sir James Gowans.

In 1917 aged 70 he was elected a Fellow of the Royal Society of Edinburgh. His proposers were John Horne, Cargill Gilston Knott, Sir Edmund Taylor Whittaker and Sir James Walker. In 1918 he was created a Commander of the Order of the Bath (CBE). The University of Edinburgh awarded him an honorary doctorate (LLD) in 1919.

He died on 10 July 1922. He is buried in Dean Cemetery in western Edinburgh. The grave lies against the north wall of the first northern extension.

== Family ==
In 1879 he married Helen Georgina Roberts (1856–1949). They had several children including Helen Roberts Harrison MBE ARRC (1888–1969), who funded the purchase of Gladstone's Land by the National Trust and Alexander (Sandy) Harrison CBE (1890-1988).

== Publications ==
- Oure Tounis Colledge: Sketches of the History of the Old College of Edinburgh (1884)
- The Scot in Ulster (1888)
- The Company of Merchants of Edinburgh and its Schools 1694–1920 (1920)
- The History of the Monastery of the Holyrood and of the Palace of Holyrood House (1919)
