= John Fenn (priest) =

English Roman Catholic priest and writer

John Fenn (born at Montacute near Yeovil, Somerset; d. 27 December 1615) was an English Roman Catholic priest and writer, in exile under Elizabeth I of England. He was the elder brother of James Fenn, the Catholic martyr, and Robert Fenn.

== Life ==
After being a chorister at Wells Cathedral, he went to Winchester School in 1547, and in 1550 to New College, Oxford, of which he was elected Fellow in 1552. Next year he became head master of the Bury St Edmunds Grammar School, but was deprived of this office and also of his fellowship for refusing to take the oath of supremacy under Elizabeth.

He went to Rome where after four years' study he was ordained priest about 1566. Having for a time been chaplain to William Stanley's regiment in Flanders, he settled at Leuven, where he lived for forty years.

In 1609, when the English Augustinian Canonnesses founded St. Monica's Priory in Leuven, he became their first chaplain, until in 1611 when his sight failed. He continued to live in the priory, until his death.

== Works ==
He contributed to the publication, in 1583, by John Gibbons, of various accounts of persecution of English Catholics, under the title Concertatio Ecclesiae Catholicae in Angliâ. This was the groundwork of the larger collection published by Bridgewater under the same name in 1588.

Besides his Vitae quorundam Martyrum in Angliâ, included in the Concertatio, he translated into Latin John Fisher's "Treatise on the penitential Psalms" (1597) and two of his sermons; he also published English versions of the Catechism of the Council of Trent, Jerome Osorio de Fonseca's reply to Walter Haddon's attack on his letter to Queen Elizabeth (1568), Guerra's "Treatise of Tribulation", an Italian life of Catherine of Sienna (1609; 1867), and the "Instructions How to Meditate the Misteries of the Rosarie" of Gaspar Loarte.

He also collected from old English sources some spiritual treatises for the Brigettine nuns of Syon House.
