= George Haydock =

English Roman Catholic priest and martyr

Blessed George Haydock
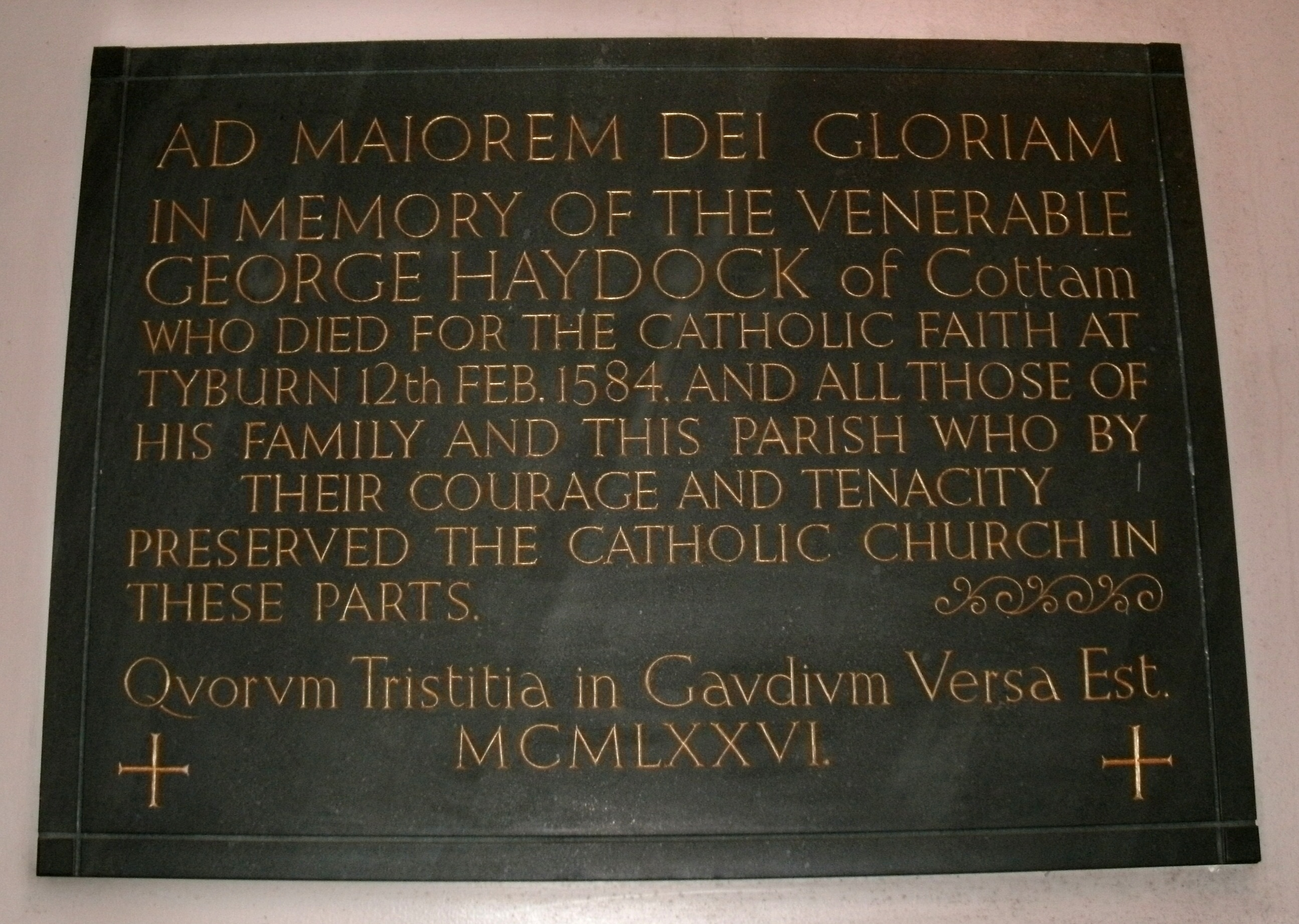
- Plaque honouring Blessed George Haydock in St. Andrew's & Blessed George Haydock's Catholic Church, Cottam, Lancashire, UK.

Martyr
- Born: c. 1556; Cottam Hall, Preston, Lancashire, England
- Died: 12 February 1584; Tyburn, London, England
- Venerated in: Roman Catholic Church
- Beatified: 22 November 1987 by Pope John Paul II
- Feast: 12 February (individual with companions); 22 November (together with Eighty-five martyrs of England and Wales)

George Haydock (born 1556; executed at Tyburn, 12 February 1584) was an English Roman Catholic priest. He is a Catholic martyr, beatified in 1987. He is not to be confused with his relative, also a priest, George Leo Haydock (1774–1849).

== Life ==
He was the youngest son of Evan Haydock of Cottam Hall near Preston, Lancashire, and Helen, daughter of William Westby of Mowbreck Hall, Lancashire. After his wife died, Evan Haydock took up studies at the English College, Douai, and was ordained. He returned to England, where he worked for some years before becoming an agent or procurator of the college. His sons Richard and George followed him to Douai. Richard became a doctor of divinity in Rome.

From Douai, George Haydock went to the English College, Rome. He was ordained priest (apparently at Rheims), on 21 December 1581.

He arrived in England in mid-January 1582 and was arrested around 4 February while visiting an old acquaintance named Hawkinson. In the five years since they'd last met, Hawkinson, a former Catholic, had apostatised and having then encountered Haydock in London, informed the priest hunters Norton and Sledd.

Haydock spent a year and three months in confinement in the Tower of London, suffering from a malarial fever he first contracted in the early summer of 1581 when visiting the seven churches of Rome. About May 1583, though he remained in the Tower, his imprisonment was relaxed to "free custody", and he was able to administer the Sacraments to his fellow prisoners. During the first period of his captivity he was accustomed to decorating his cell with the name and arms of the Pope scratched or drawn in charcoal on the door or walls, and through his career, he remained faithful to the spiritual authority of the Papacy.

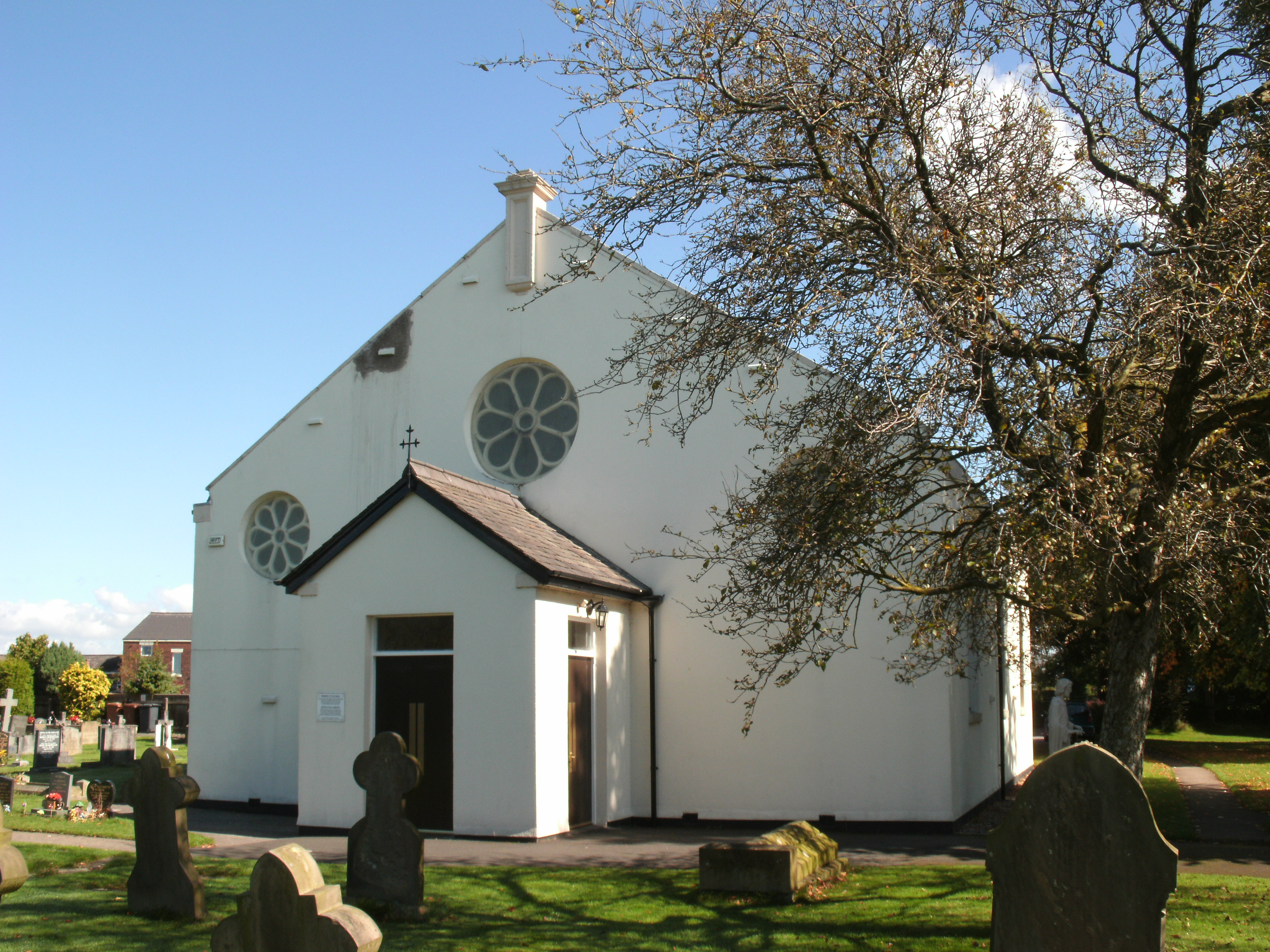
Cottam: St. Andrew's & Blessed George Haydock's Catholic Church. Built during the Recusant era in 1790 and still in operation. Haydock's name was added after his beatification in 1987.

On 16 January 1584, he and other priests imprisoned in the Tower were examined at the Guildhall by the recorder, touching their beliefs. He frankly confessed, with reluctance, that he was eventually obliged to declare his treason in claiming that the queen was a heretic, and so seal his fate.

On 5 February 1584, he was indicted with James Fenn, a Somersetshire man, formerly fellow of Corpus Christi College, Oxford, William Deane who had been ordained priest the same day as himself, and six other priests, for having conspired against the queen at Rheims, 23 September 1581, agreeing to come to England, 1 October, and setting out for England, 1 November. In point of fact, he arrived at Rheims on 1 November 1581.

On the same 5 February two further indictments were brought, the one against Thomas Hemerford, a Dorsetshire man, sometime scholar of St John's College, Oxford, the other against John Munden, a Dorsetshire man, sometime fellow of New College, Oxford, John Nutter, a Lancashire man, sometime scholar of St John's College, Cambridge, and two other priests. The next day, St Dorothy's Day, Haydock, Fenn, Hemerford, Munden, and Nutter were brought to the bar and pleaded not guilty.

Haydock had for a long time shown a great devotion to St Dorothy, and was accustomed to committing himself and his actions to her daily protection. It may be that he first entered the college at Douai on that day in 1574–5, but this is uncertain. The Concertatio Ecclesiae says he was arrested on this day in 1581–2, but the Tower bills state that he was committed to the Tower on the 5th, in which case he was arrested on the 4th. On Friday the 7th, all five were found guilty, and sentenced to death. The other four were committed in shackles to "the pit" in the Tower. Haydock, perhaps in case he should die by a natural death, was sent back to his old quarters.

== Thomas Hemerford ==
Blessed Thomas Hemerford
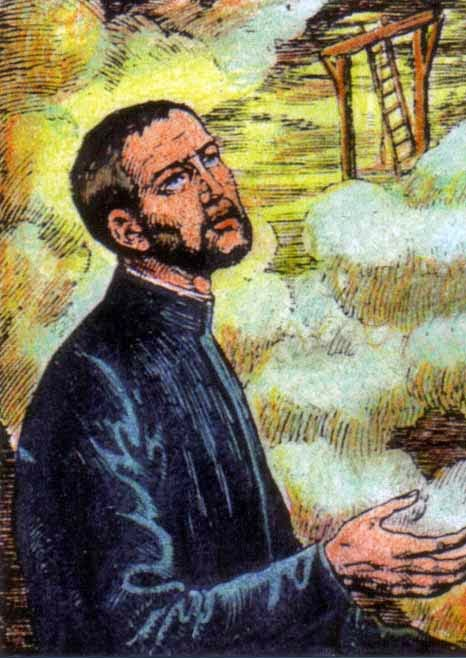

Martyr
- Born: c. 1553; Dorsetshire, England
- Died: 12 February 1584 (aged 30 - 31); Tyburn, London, England
- Honored in: Roman Catholic Church
- Beatified: 15 December 1929 by Pope Pius XI
- Feast: 12 February

Thomas Hemerford was born about 1553 in Dorsetshire, and studied at St John's College, Oxford. On 30 June 1575 he obtained a Bachelor of Civil Law degree from Hart Hall. In October 1580 he entered the English College at Rome. Hemerford is described as "a short man with a dark beard, severe of look but of a sweet disposition".

Ordained in Rheims in March 1583, he arrived in Hampshire in June. He was obliged to stay in a village while the blacksmith replaced a shoe on his horse, and a passerby denounced him as the priest who had preached in the barn. He was imprisoned at Winchester and then brought to the Marshalsea where he was indicted for conspiring with John Mundyn for the death of the Queen. From there he was committed to the Tower. Hemerford was tried and found guilty, despite a defective indictment, on 7 February 1584, and hanged, drawn, and quartered at Tyburn on 12 February.

== John Mundyn ==
John Mundyn or Munden was born in the Manor of Coltley in Dorset. He entered Winchester College in 1555 at the age of twelve, and attended New College, Oxford, but was deprived for failing to communicate since the accession of Elizabeth. He then became for a time a schoolmaster in Dorset. In 1580 he left to study civil law at Douai, then at Rheims. In October 1581 he entered the English College in Rome. By June 1582 he was back at Rheims and left for the English Mission the following August.

In February 1583, while riding from Winchester to London, he happened on Hounslow Heath a magistrate from Dorset who recognised him. Mundyn was then arrested. Walsingham was so dissatisfied with Mundyn's answers when questioned that he gave the priest a blow to the face that affected Mundyn's hearing for several days. Mundyn was remanded to the Broad Arrow Tower at the Tower of London. Mundyn was tried for conspiring against the Queen and condemned on 6 February 1584.

James Fenn and Thomas Hemerford were beatified by Pope Pius XI in December 1929. Their feast day is 12 February.

Blessed John Munden
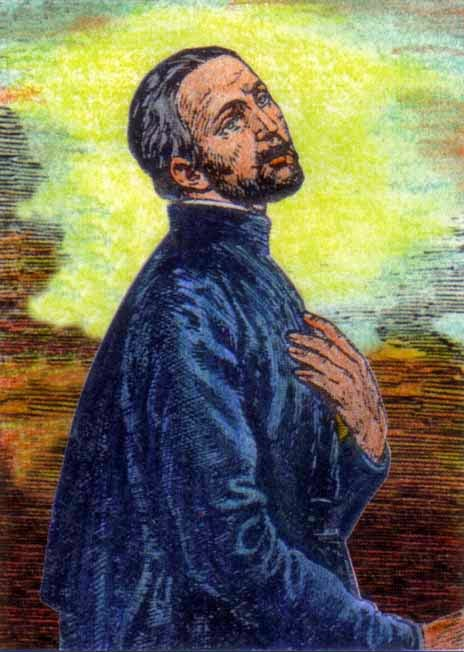

Martyr
- Born: c. 1543; Manor of Coltley in Dorset
- Died: 12 February 1584 (aged 41 - 42); Tyburn, London, England
- Honored in: Roman Catholic Church
- Beatified: 15 December 1929 by Pope Pius XI
- Feast: 12 February

== Death ==
Early on Wednesday the 12th the five priests were drawn to Tyburn on hurdles; Haydock, being probably the youngest and certainly the weakest in health, was the first to suffer. All were hanged, cut down before dead, and dismembered alive.

== See also ==
- Catholic Church in the United Kingdom
- Douai Martyrs
- James Fenn
