= John Stevens Henslow =

British botanist, geologist, and priest (1796–1861)

The Reverend John Henslow
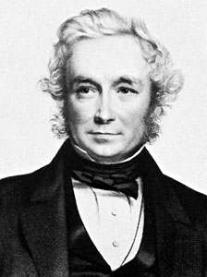
- Henslow c. 1851
- Born: 6 February 1796; Rochester, England, Great Britain
- Died: 16 May 1861 (aged 65); Hitcham, England, British Empire
- Education: St. John's College, Cambridge
- Known for: Geology of Anglesey, mentoring Charles Darwin
- Spouse: Harriet Jenyns (m. 1823)
- Children: Frances, Anne, and George
- Scientific career
- Fields: Geology, Botany
- Institutions: University of Cambridge
- Notable students: Miles Joseph Berkeley, Cardale Babington, Leonard Jenyns, Richard Thomas Lowe, William Hallowes Miller
- Author abbrev. (botany): Hensl.

John Stevens Henslow (6 February 1796 – 16 May 1861) was an English Anglican priest, botanist and geologist. He is best remembered as friend and mentor to Charles Darwin.

== Early life ==
Henslow was born at Rochester, Kent, the son of a solicitor John Prentis Henslow, who was the son of John Henslow.

Henslow was educated at St. John's College, Cambridge where he graduated as 16th wrangler in 1818, the year in which Adam Sedgwick became Woodwardian Professor of Geology.

== Early career ==
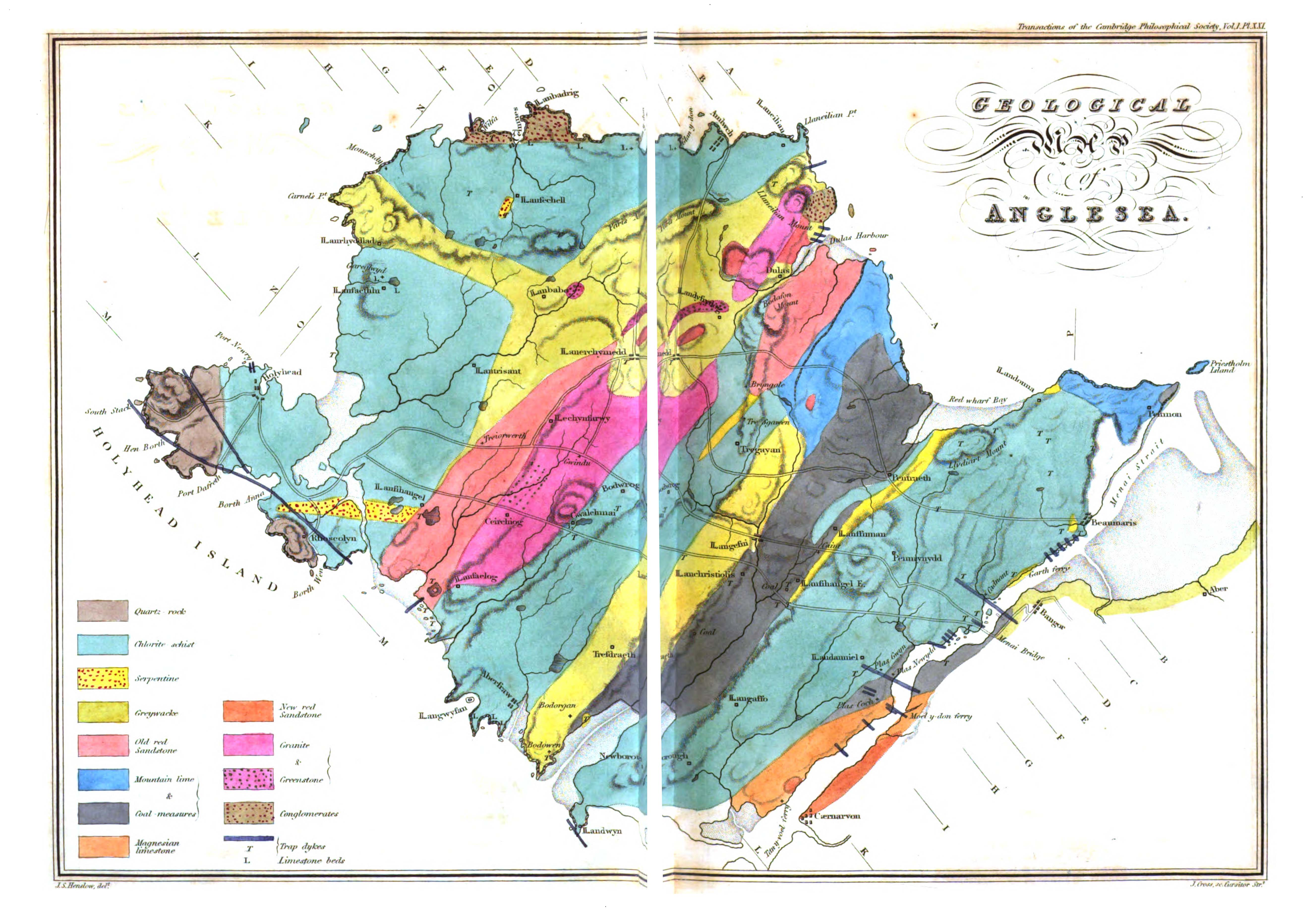
Henslow's 'Geological map of Anglesea' 1822

Henslow graduated in 1818. He already had a passion for natural history from his childhood, which largely influenced his career, and he accompanied Sedgwick in 1819 on a tour in the Isle of Wight where he learned his first lessons in geology. He also studied chemistry under Professor James Cumming and mineralogy under Edward Clarke. In the autumn of 1819 he made valuable observations on the geology of the Isle of Man (Trans. Geol. Soc., 1821) and in 1820 and 1821 he investigated the geology of parts of Anglesey, the results being printed in the first volume of the Transactions of the Cambridge Philosophical Society (1822). The Philosophical Society was founded in November 1819 by a group at Cambridge with Professors Farish, Lee, and Sedgwick and Henslow (at that time not yet a professor). The idea and initial impetus for the society originated from Sedgwick and Henslow.

Meanwhile, Henslow had studied mineralogy with considerable zeal, so that on the death of Clarke he was in 1822 appointed professor of mineralogy in the University of Cambridge. Two years later he took holy orders. Botany, however, had claimed much of his attention, and to this science he became more and more attached, so that he gladly resigned the chair of mineralogy in 1827, two years after becoming professor of botany. As a teacher both in the classroom and in the field he was eminently successful. He was a correspondent of John James Audubon who in 1829 named Henslow's sparrow (Centronyx henslowii) after him.

From 1821 Henslow had begun organising a herbarium of British flora, supplementing his own collecting with a network which expanded over time to include his friends and family, and the botanists William Jackson Hooker and John Hutton Balfour, as well as about 30 of his students. As a mineralogist he had used Haüy's laws of crystallography to analyse complex crystals as transformations of "the primitive form of the species" of crystal, and when he moved to botany in 1825 he sought similarly precise laws to group plant varieties into species, often including as varieties plants that respected taxonomists had ranked as separate species. He followed the understanding of the time that species were fixed as created but could vary within limits, and hoped to analyse these limits of variation. By a method he called "collation", Henslow prepared sheets with several plant specimens, each labelled with the collector, date and place of collection, comparing the specimens to show the variation within the species. His A Catalogue of British Plants was first published in October 1829, and became a set book for his lecture course.

Henslow is remembered as friend and mentor to his pupil Charles Darwin, and for inspiring him with a passion for natural history. The two met in 1828. Earlier that year, Darwin joined the course and along with other students helped to collect plants of Cambridgeshire. Henslow became his tutor, and it was not long before he marked out Darwin as a promising student. In 1830 Henslow experimented on varying the conditions of garden grown wild plants to produce various forms of the plant. In 1835 Henslow published Principles of Descriptive and Physiological Botany as a textbook based on this lecture course.

In the summer of 1831 Henslow was offered a place as naturalist to sail aboard the survey ship HMS Beagle on a two-year voyage to survey South America, but his wife dissuaded him from accepting. Seeing a perfect opportunity for his protégé, Henslow wrote to the ship's captain Robert Fitzroy telling him that Darwin was the ideal man to join the expedition team. During the voyage, Darwin corresponded with Henslow, and collected plants with him in mind. In particular, when first arriving at the Galápagos Islands Darwin noted "I certainly recognize S America in Ornithology, would a botanist?", and went on to collect plant specimens carefully labelled by island and date. He also labelled the mockingbirds he caught, and initially thought these were varieties but while arranging these bird specimens on the last lap of the voyage he began wondering if they could be species, a possibility which would "undermine the stability of Species". Henslow's teaching continued to influence Darwin's work on evolution.

Besides Darwin, other famous students of Henslow included Miles Joseph Berkeley, Cardale Babington, Leonard Jenyns, Richard Lowe, and William Miller.

== A country clergyman ==
In 1833, Henslow was appointed vicar of Cholsey-cum-Moulsford in Berkshire (now Oxfordshire). He continued to live in Cambridge, only visiting the parish during vacations; he appointed a curate to conduct services and parish business during term-time. When there were allegations of bribery and corruption concerning the Tory candidate for Cambridge in the 1835 general election, Henslow put himself forward as the nominal prosecutor. Supporters of the Tory candidate subjected him to abuse and wrote "Henslow, common informer" on walls.

His appointment in 1837 to the remunerative Crown living at Hitcham, Suffolk marked a turning-point in his life. This time, in 1839, he moved to the parish, and as rector of Hitcham he lived at the rectory. He worked there, endearing himself to all who knew him, until the end of his life. His energies were devoted to the improvement of his parishioners, but his influence was felt far and wide. Botany at Cambridge suffered, attendance at lectures fell, and we have records of complaints made within the university. Henslow did not resign his chair, and continued to give lectures, set and mark exams, and take part in university affairs. Nevertheless, his influence there was naturally much reduced.

Henslow's work in Hitcham, over and above the normal duties of a Rector, can be summarised as follows:

1. The Parish School and other charities. Hitcham was a poor parish, and most people would have been illiterate. Education had to be paid for, and so Henslow both raised funds and donated his own money to support a school. The school was founded in 1841, and Henslow himself gave a series of volunteer classes on Monday afternoons for some of the older children. The botanical curriculum was printed.
The botany taught in this school had effects throughout Britain, because important people at the centre, such as Prince Albert and Lyon Playfair kept in touch and rightly regarded Henslow as an authority on the subject.
2. Adult education in the Village. The Hitcham Labourers' and Mechanics' Horticultural Society was the vehicle used by Henslow to 'improve' the labouring and agricultural workers in the village and its surrounds. Competitions, shows and excursions were the attractions, and the intent was practical, to improve agriculture by educating the parishioners. Henslow made use of gifts and facilities provided by his friends. Advances such as made by Justus Liebig in Germany, who began to apply chemistry to the needs of agriculture, had not yet become widely utilised.
3. Museums. The town of Ipswich is twelve miles from Hitcham. As a result of his Cambridge experiences, Henslow believed in the value of museums as vehicles for education. Ipswich Museum was established in 1847 as a natural history museum and owed much to Henslow, who was elected its President in 1850.

Alongside this work he remained an inquiring scientist at heart. In 1843 he discovered nodules of coprolitic origin in the Red Crag at Felixstowe in Suffolk, and two years later he called attention to those also in the Cambridge Greensand and remarked that they might be of use in agriculture. Although Henslow derived no benefit, these discoveries led to the establishment of the phosphate industry in Suffolk and Cambridgeshire; and the works proved lucrative until the introduction of foreign phosphates.

In 1851, Carl Blume named a genus of flowering plants belonging to the family Santalaceae, from Indo-China as Henslowia, in honour of Henslow.

Henslow died on 16 May 1861 at Hitcham.

== Family ==
Henslow married Harriet Jenyns (1797–1857), daughter of George Jenyns and sister of Leonard Jenyns on 16 December 1823. Their eldest daughter Frances Harriet married Joseph Hooker, and their youngest daughter, Anne, became a botanical artist. Their sons included George Henslow, who became the Royal Horticultural Society's Professor of Botany and the first President of the Churchmen's Union for the Advancement of Liberal Religious Thought.

== Selected publications ==
- Henslow, John Stevens (1822). "Geological Description of Anglesea". Transactions of the Cambridge Philosophical Society. 1: 359–452.
- Henslow, John Stevens. (1823). A Syllabus of a Course of Lectures on Mineralogy. Deighton (reissued by Cambridge University Press, 2009; ISBN 978-1-108-00201-1)
- Henslow, John Stevens. (1829; 2nd ed. 1835). A Catalogue of British Plants.
- Henslow, John Stevens. (1835). The Principles of Descriptive and Physiological Botany. Longman, Rees, Orme, Brown & Green (reissued by Cambridge University Press, 2009; ISBN 978-1-108-00186-1)
- Henslow, John Stevens. (1846). The Teaching of Science in Cambridge. Metcalfe and Palmer (reissued by Cambridge University Press, 2009; ISBN 978-1-108-00200-4)
- Henslow, John Stevens. (1856). A Dictionary of Botanical Terms. Groombridge (reissued by Cambridge University Press, 2009; ISBN 978-1-108-00131-1)
- Henslow, John Stevens, and Skepper, E. (1866). Flora of Suffolk

== Sources ==
- Jenyns, Leonard (1862). Memoir of the Rev. John Stevens Henslow, M.A., F.L.S., F.G.S., F.C.P.S.: Late Rector of Hitcham and Professor of Botany in the University of Cambridge. London: John van Voorst.
- Kohn, D.; Murrell, G.; Parker, J.; Whitehorn, M. (2005). "What Henslow taught Darwin" (PDF). Nature. 436 (7051): 643–645. Bibcode:2005Natur.436..643K. doi:10.1038/436643a. PMID 16079834. S2CID 4300384.
- S.M. Walters and E.A. Stow (2001) Darwin's mentor: John Stevens Henslow. Cambridge University Press. ISBN 0-521-59146-5
- Nora Barlow (ed). 1967. Darwin and Henslow: The Growth of an Idea. Letters, 1831–1860. Murray, London.
- S.J. Plunkett 2002. Ipswich Museum Moralities in the 1840s and 1850s, in C. Harper-Bill (ed) East Anglia's History: studies in honour of Norman Scarfe Boydell, Woodbridge 2002, 309–332. Google preview
- Image source: Portraits of the Honorary Members of the Ipswich Museum (Portfolio of 60 lithographs by T.H. Maguire) George Ransome, Ipswich, 1846–1852.
