= Edinburgh Chess Club =

- Type: Regional Chess Club
- Founded: 1822
- Location: Edinburgh
- Country: Scotland
- Website: Official Website

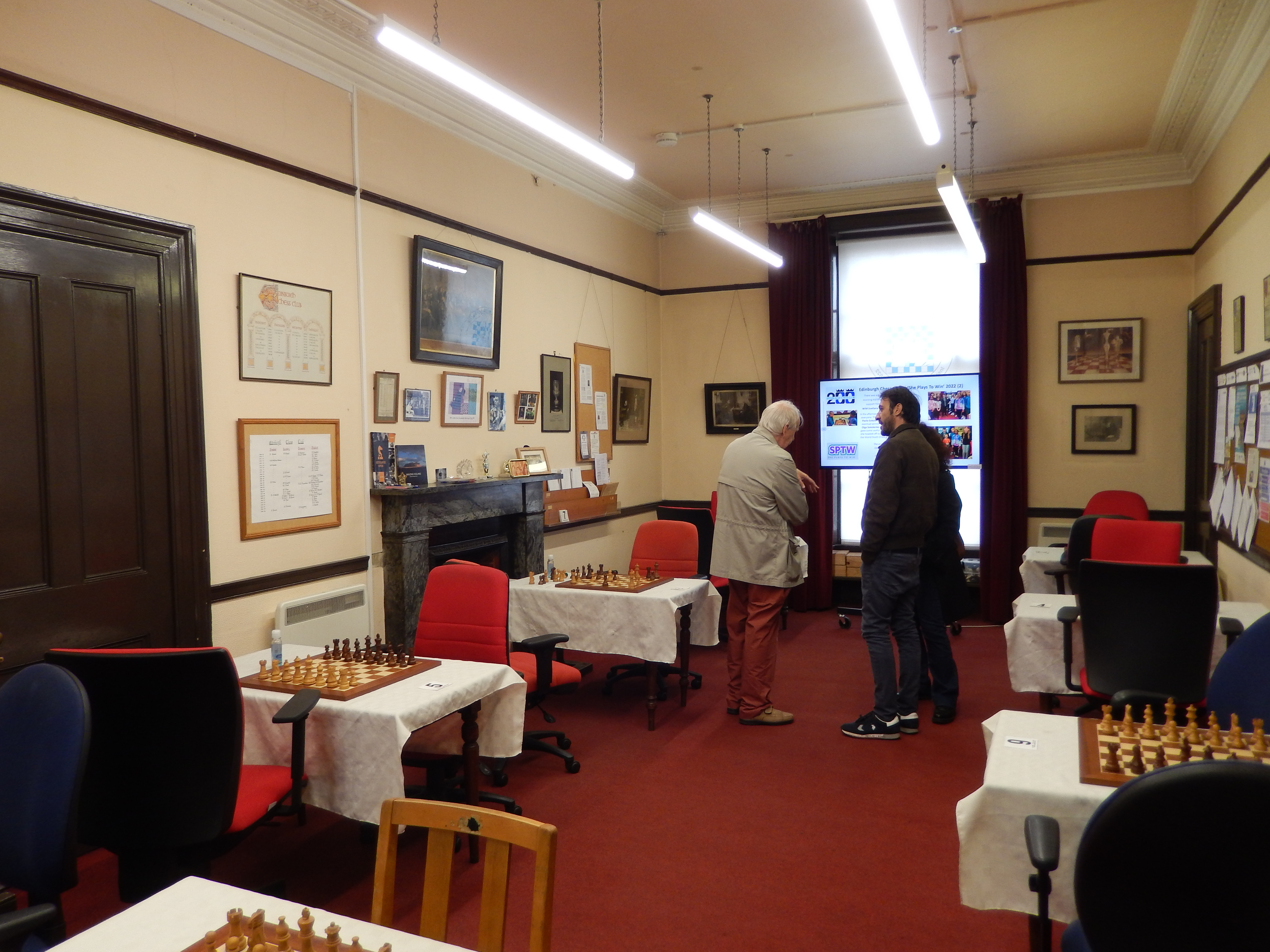
Inside Edinburgh Chess Club

The Edinburgh Chess Club was founded in 1822 and is the oldest continually existing Chess club in Scotland and second oldest in the world.
