= Jack Harrison (footballer, born 1900) =

Australian rules footballer, born 1900

Personal information
- Full name: John Harrison
- Born: 1 May 1900; Footscray, Victoria
- Died: 16 November 1982 (aged 82); Maffra, Victoria
- Height: 173 cm (5 ft 8 in)
- Weight: 72 kg (159 lb)

Playing career^{1}
Years	Club	Games (Goals)
1919	Essendon	1 (0)
- ^{1} Playing statistics correct to the end of 1919.

Jack Harrison (1 May 1900 – 16 November 1982) was an Australian rules footballer who played with Essendon in the Victorian Football League (VFL).
