= Jon Harrison (U.S. Navy) =

Former chief of staff in the US Navy

Jon Harrison is the former chief of staff of the United States secretary of the Navy from February to October 2025.

He has a bachelor's degree from the University of Southampton.

Before his federal appointment, Harrison was a board member of Albers Aerospace, an aviation and defense engineering firm.

He previously worked in the U.S. State Department and as the chairman of the U.S. Arctic Research Commission.

Harrison is the chair of the District Board of Trustees of Palm Beach State College and a board member of Florida Atlantic University.

An appointee of President Donald Trump in January 2025, Harrison had worked to streamline the Navy’s policy and budgeting offices. He was fired by US defense secretary Pete Hegseth in October of the same year.
