= George Leonard Jenyns =

English priest and landowner (1763–1848)

George Leonard Jenyns (19 June 1763–1848) was an English priest, a landowner involved both in the Bedford Level Corporation and in the Board of Agriculture.

== Life ==
He was the son of John Harvey Jenyns of Eye, Suffolk, and was born at Roydon, Norfolk. He entered Gonville and Caius College, Cambridge, in 1781. He graduated Bachelor of Arts (BA) in 1785, and was ordained that year, and received his Master of Arts (Cambridge) (MA Cantab) in 1788. He became Dean and rhetorical praelector of his college in 1787, though not a fellow, this being the first recorded instance.

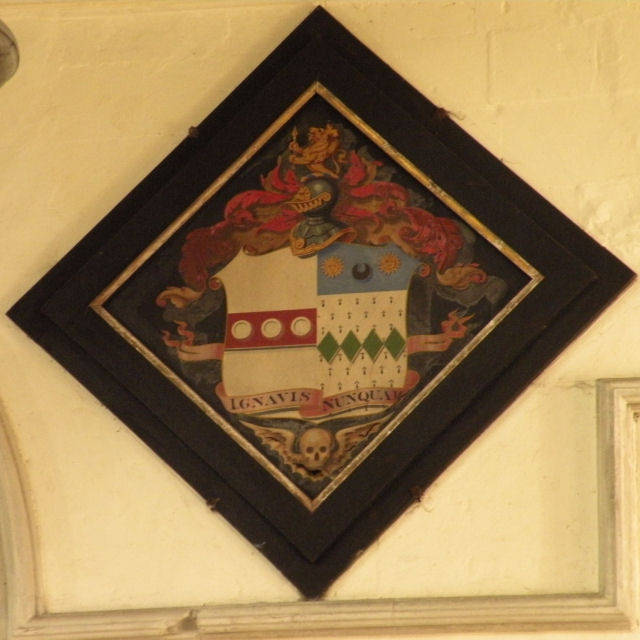
Jenyns's hatchment, Bottisham

He was vicar of Swaffham Prior, Cambridgeshire, 1787–1848 and prebendary of Ely Cathedral, 1802–1848. He inherited Bottisham Hall in Bottisham and a considerable fortune from his first cousin twice removed Soame Jenyns in 1787. He became Chairman of the Bedford Level Corporation, and also of the Board of Agriculture. At Bottisham Hall he built a new house, constructed for him by 1797; and also expanded the Jenyns estate by purchases.

== Family ==
In 1788 he married Mary Heberden (1763–1832), the daughter of the physician William Heberden (1710–1801). They had the following children:

- Soame Jenyns (died aged 14)
- Mary Jenyns (1790–1858)
- George Jenyns (1795–1878) married Maria Jane, daughter of Sir James Gambier, 1772-1833
- Charles Jenyns (1798–1887)
- Leonard Jenyns (1800–1893), the naturalist.
- Elizabeth Jenyns
- Harriet Jenyns (1797–1857), married John Stevens Henslow.
