= Jonathan Baxter Harrison =

Unitarian minister, journalist, early social scientist

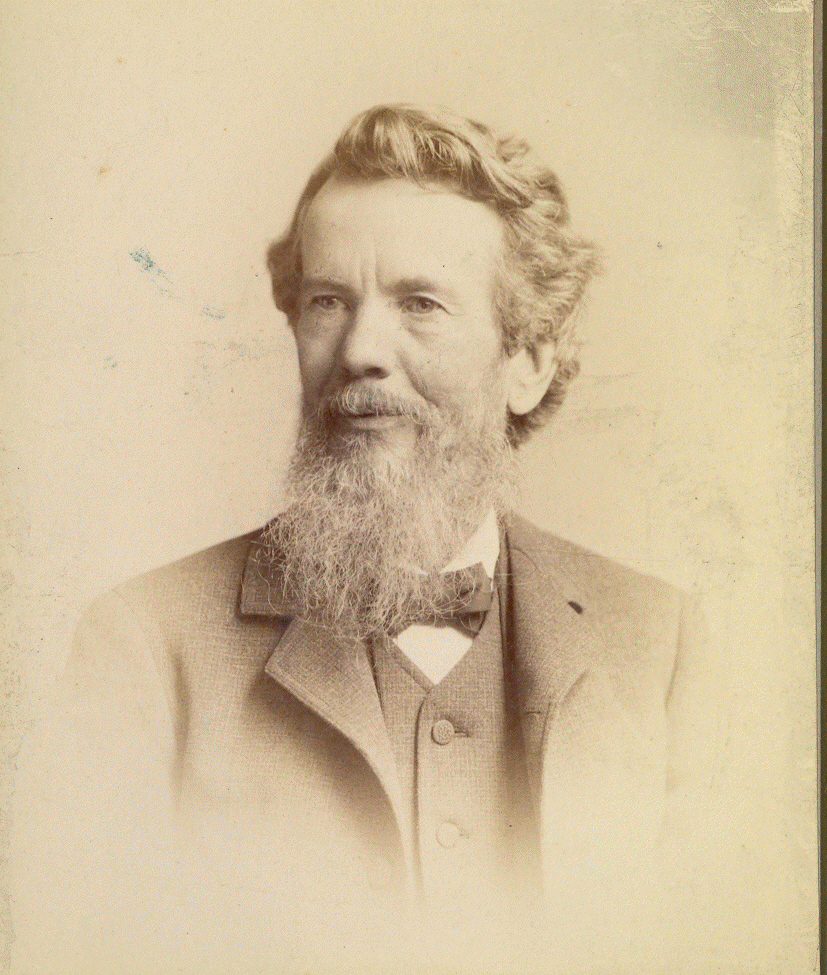
- Jonathan Baxter Harrison, around 1880
- Born: April 5, 1835; Greene County, Ohio, U.S.
- Died: June 17, 1907; Franklin, New Hampshire, U.S.
- Occupations: journalist, Unitarian minister
- Known for: advocacy of forest preservation; studies of New England working class, Indian reservations, and post Civil War South

Jonathan Baxter Harrison (April 5, 1835 – June 17, 1907), was a Unitarian minister and journalist who was involved in many of the social causes of his day: abolitionism, Indian rights, forest preservation, and the cultural improvement of the working class. Best known for his realistic depictions of everyday American life, he is acknowledged as an important influence in the development of literary realism.

== Life ==
Born in a log cabin in Greene County, Ohio, he early showed an eagerness for reading, often studying beside the fire at night after a long day spent working in the fields. As a young man, he became a backwoods Methodist minister, and then worked for a Quaker-run abolitionist paper. At the outbreak of the American Civil War, he joined, with the rank of First Sergeant, the 8th Indiana Infantry Regiment, a regiment of volunteers formed for a three-month period of service; the regiment fought at the Battle of Rich Mountain under the command of William Rosecrans. He spent the remaining war years as editor of the Winchester Journal in Randolph County, Indiana, where he began corresponding with Charles Eliot Norton, the secretary of the Loyal Publication Society, beginning a lifelong friendship. In Norton’s papers, we see Harrison described as a figure much like Abraham Lincoln: an unaffected frontiersman, at once virtuous and wise.

After the war, Harrison became a Unitarian minister and active in Spiritualism, a religious movement that attracted many abolitionists and other reformers. To be closer to Norton, Harrison moved east, obtaining a position as Unitarian minister 1870-1873 in Montclair, New Jersey, and then from 1879-1884 in Franklin Falls, New Hampshire, where he lived until his death. He made the acquaintance of members of Norton’s circle, such as Frederick Law Olmsted, the landscape architect and social critic, and William Dean Howells, the editor of The Atlantic Monthly.

At the encouragement of Norton and his friends, Harrison began writing on some of the most important social issues of the day. These included the conditions in the South after the end of Reconstruction; working class culture and political life in New England; the condition of the American Indians; and the deforestation of the Northeast. During the 1882 campaign to preserve the natural environment around Niagara Falls, Harrison wrote a series of letters to newspapers in Boston and New York that turned public opinion in favor of preservation. By 1889 he was a well-known figure among New England journalists and intellectuals; in that year he was awarded an honorary degree (Artium Magister) by Harvard University.

Harrison was recognized by his friends as someone with a unique and perceptive view of American life. His work has an ethnographic feel, particularly his documentation of life in the South following the Civil War, based on extensive travels and contact with ordinary people in the everyday business of life. One of his major concerns was to show the highly educated cultural elite how the rest of America lived, thought, and felt. Like Charles Eliot Norton, he was a conservative in the stamp of Matthew Arnold, worried that capitalism insidiously worked to degrade culture, and part of his intentions—particularly in documenting the life of the New England working class—was to make the cultured elite more aware and more concerned about the spiritual life of ordinary people. His work remains today as an important testimony of the conditions of life in the United States of the late nineteenth century.

== Selected Writings of Jonathan Baxter Harrison ==
=== Religion ===
- "Religious Condition of the West." Radical: A Monthly Magazine, Devoted to Religion. 2(1866):234
- "Lessons of Methodism." Old and New. 4(1871):189
- "Methods of Dealing with Social Questions." pages 249-254 in Institute Essays; read before the Ministers’ Institute, October 1879, Providence R.I. with Introduction by Rev. H.W. Bellows. Boston: G.H. Ellis. 1880.

=== New England Social Classes and Everyday Life ===
- "Certain Dangerous Tendencies in American Life." The Atlantic Monthly. October, 1878 42(252):385-403
- "The Nationals, their Origin and their Aims." The Atlantic Monthly. November, 1878 42(253):521-530
- "Three Typical Workingmen." The Atlantic Monthly. December, 1878 42(254):717-727
- "Workingmen's Wives." The Atlantic Monthly. January, 1879 43(255):59-71
- "The Career of a Capitalist." The Atlantic Monthly. February, 1879 43(256):129-135
- "Study of a New England Factory Town." The Atlantic Monthly. June, 1879 43(260):689-705
- "Preaching." The Atlantic Monthly. August, 1879 44(262):129-137
- "Sincere Demagogy." The Atlantic Monthly. October, 1879 44(264):488-500
- Certain Dangerous Tendencies in American Life, and Other Papers. Houghton, Osgood and Company, Boston. 1880. (reprint edition: ISBN 1-120-17316-7)
- Notes on Industrial Conditions. Franklin Falls, N.H.: J.B. Harrison & Sons. 1886.
- "The Sale of Votes in New Hampshire." The Century: A Popular Quarterly. November, 1893 47(1):149-150

=== Post-Reconstruction Period in the South ===
"Studies in the South." The Atlantic Monthly:

- January, 1882 49(291):76-92;
- February, 1882 49(292):179-195;
- May, 1882 49(295):673-685;
- June, 1882 49(296):740-752;
- July, 1882 50(297):99-110;
- August, 1882 50(298):194-205;
- September, 1882 50(299):349-361;
- October, 1882 50(300):476-488;
- November, 1882 50(301):623-634;
- December, 1882 50(302):750-764;
- January, 1883 51(303):87-99

=== Native Americans ===
- "Education for Indians." Critic and Good Literature. 11(1887):321
- The latest studies on Indian reservations. Philadelphia: The Indian Rights Association. 1887.
- The colleges and the Indians, and the Indian Rights Association. (pamphlet) Philadelphia: The Indian Rights Association. 1888.
- "Indians of the United States." Chautauquan: A Monthly Magazine Devoted to the Promotion of True Culture. 9(1888):140, 208

=== The Natural Environment ===
- The Condition of Niagara Falls, and the Measures Needed to Preserve Them: Eight Letters Published in the New York Evening Post, the New York Tribune, and the Boston Daily Advertiser, during the Summer of 1882. (pamphlet) New York: Cambridge, J. Wilson and Son. 1882.
- "Forest Destruction." (Editorial) The New York Times. Aug. 5, 1888 Page:4 Column:4
- with Frederick Law Olmsted, Observations on the Treatment of Public Plantations, More Especially Relating to the Use of the Axe. (pamphlet) Boston: T. R. Marvin, Printers. 1889. Reprinted in F.L. Olmsted, Jr. and Theodora Kimball (editors), Forty Years of Landscape Architecture: Central Park. Boston: MIT Press. 1973.
- "Abandoned Farms of New Hampshire." Granite Monthly. 13(1890):153
- "Conservancy of Forests by the State." Cosmopolitan: A Monthly Illustrated Magazine. 13(1892):300
- "White Mountain Forests." Garden and Forest: A Journal of Horticulture, Landscape Art and Forestry. 6(1893): 106.
- "Our Forest Interests in Relation to the American Mind." The New England Magazine: An Illustrated Monthly. December, 1893 15(4):417-424
