= Bottisham Hall =

Historic house in Cambridgeshire, United Kingdom

Coordinates: 52.2299°N 0.26958°E

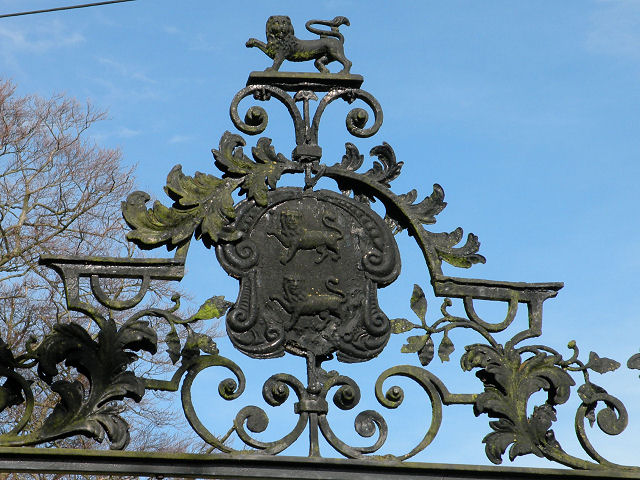
Gateway to Bottisham Park

Bottisham Hall is a country house in Bottisham, Cambridgeshire, England.

Built in 1797 for the Reverend George Leonard Jenyns to replace the family's previous home on the same estate, it is set in 56 hectares of parkland. It is listed Grade II on the National Heritage List for England.
