= King Edward VI School, Bury St Edmunds =

King Edward VI Church of England Voluntary Controlled Upper School
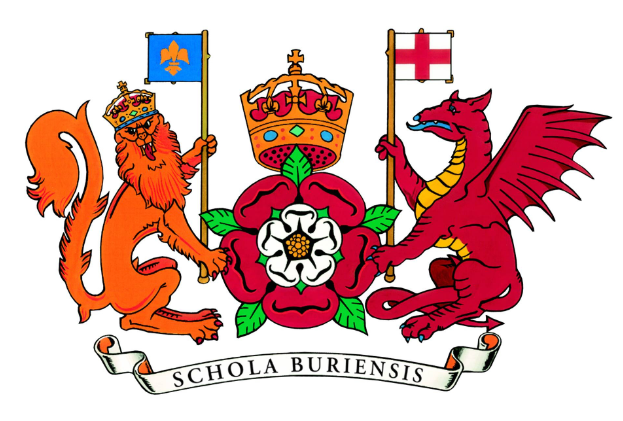

Location
- Grove Road; Bury St Edmunds, Suffolk, IP33 3BH; England; 52°15′03″N 0°42′15″E

Information
- Type: Voluntary controlled school
- Motto: Schola Buriensis
- Religious affiliation: Church of England
- Established: c. 1550; 476 years ago
- Founder: King Edward VI
- Local authority: Suffolk
- Department for Education URN: 124856 Tables
- Ofsted: Reports
- Headteacher: Tom Grey
- Gender: Coeducational
- Age: 11 to 16
- Enrolment: 1,200 (2022)
- Houses: Crown, Rose, Lion
- Colours: Crimson and Gold
- Publication: Celebrate! / The Iconoclast
- Alumni: Old Burians
- Website: http://www.king-ed.suffolk.sch.uk

King Edward VI School is a co-educational comprehensive secondary school in Bury St Edmunds, Suffolk, England. The school in its present form was created in 1972 by the merging of King Edward VI Grammar School, with the Silver Jubilee Girls School and the Silver Jubilee Boys School (founded 1935). The school occupies the site of the former Silver Jubilee schools in Grove Road, Bury St Edmunds.

== History ==
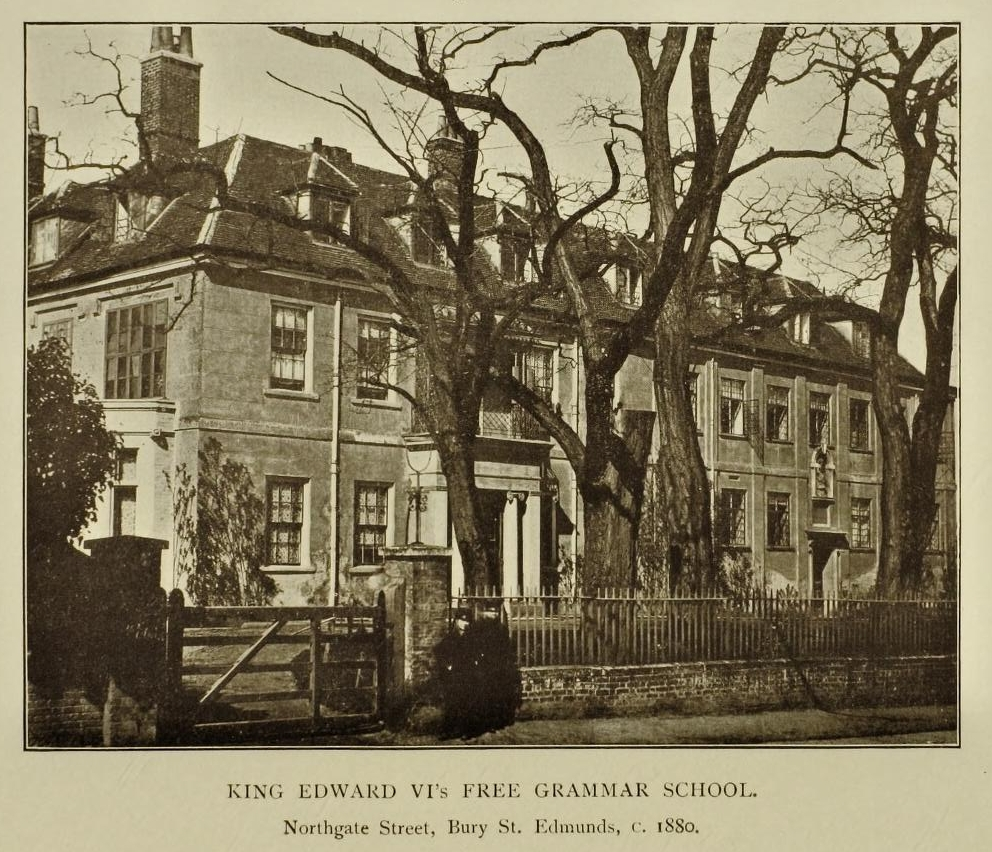
House on Northgate Street in Bury St Edmunds, home of the school between 1665 and 1883

King Edward VI School was founded about 1550 and has occupied a number of sites in the town prior to moving to the current location in 1972. In 1550 lands were given to provide funds for a "scole ther to be founded by the kinges Maiestie in the like manner as the school at Sherbourne".

King Edward VI School celebrated the 450th anniversary of its foundation in 2000. The charter with Edward's seal is in the National Archives in Kew, together with documents and books from the early years of the school's existence. One of these is the list of rules for the masters and boys. Originally a grammar school for boys, who studied Greek, Latin and religious instruction, it has moved to various different sites in the town all of which are marked with plaques donated by the Old Burians' Association.

The oldest and rarest of the Grammar School's books and records are now deposited in the Cambridge University Library. The Bury psalter which had survived from the Abbey of St Edmund is in the care of Suffolk County Council Archives. The University Library has a collection of more than 500 books belonging to the school. Some of the books were used by teachers and students – texts in Latin and Greek, stories, the plays of Shakespeare – and some were donated to the school by former students.

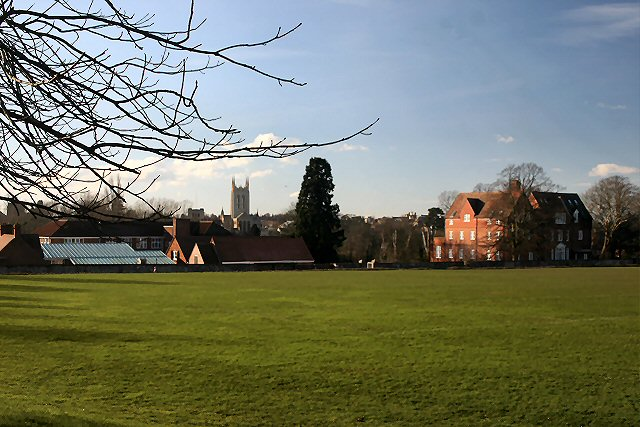
Vinefields site, home of the school 1883–1972. The Millennium Tower of St Edmundsbury Cathedral is visible in the distance.

Having been a foundation grammar school since its foundation in 1550 the school surrendered some of its independence in 1922 when it became a Direct Grant School, meaning an annual grant was paid to the school by the Board of Education for each boy above the preparatory department, provided an agreed percentage of free place boys were admitted each year. In 1944 with the enactment of the Education Act 1944, the governors of the school decided that they could no longer meet the financial demand necessary to meet the requirement of the Act in order to maintain charity and thereby Direct Grant status, given the requirements for improved facilities for curriculum delivery that the Act demanded. Accordingly, in August 1946 the school became a Voluntary Controlled School under the aegis of the West Suffolk County Council Education Committee.

In 1972 Suffolk County Council implemented a three tier comprehensive system in the west of the county. The school merged with the Silver Jubilee Boys and Girls Schools to form King Edward VI Upper School, moving to the Grove Road site of the Silver Jubilee schools. The Vinefields grammar school site became the home of St James Middle School. The middle school closed following the creation of a new 11 to 18 school system in west Suffolk.

== World Wars ==
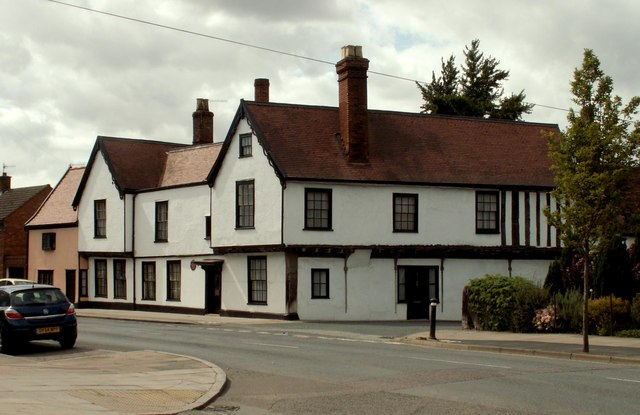
Site on Eastgate Street, home of the school 1550-1665

In common with schools of its type King Edward's has lost many old boys in war. Four Old Burians were killed in the Boer War, and thirty-two in WW1. On 4 February 1921 a memorial bearing the names of 32 old boys killed in the Great War was dedicated in the Cathedral at Bury St Edmunds. Twenty nine old boys gave their lives in WW2 and a memorial to those former pupils was placed close to the existing WW1 memorial in 1949. Both memorials were designed by Basil Oliver, an old boy of the school.

== King Edward VI School Today ==
The current school remains a Voluntary Controlled Church of England school and accepts Students from ages 11 to 16, it is attended by approximately 1400 pupils. It is a specialist sports college and is a Training school for new teachers. Since 2008, the school has also been partnered with Shanghai Yangjing-Juyan Experimental School in China to develop international links and exchanges between the schools have occurred.

The school was rated "Good" in its 2014 Ofsted Inspection and the school achieved a 77% 9-4 pass rate at GCSE and a 99% pass rate at A Level in 2018. A further inspections in 2019 and 2023 maintained the "Good" rating..

In 2016 the school became 11 to 18 institution admitting pupils in years 7, 8 and 9. The school has since become an 11 to 16 institution with the opening of the Abbeygate 6th Form College in Bury St Edmunds.

Since September 2011 until September 2022, the school had operated a house system and incorporated vertical tutoring. The school's house system operated through six 'Colleges' which have been developed to create smaller learning communities. The Colleges, all named after Suffolk places with significant heritage, were Elveden, Hengrave, Ickworth, Kentwell, Melford and Wyken. Now the school has adopted a 3 house system. The three houses are Rose House (red), Crown House (gold or green) and Lion House (blue). All named after the school crest.

== The Old Burians Association ==
There is an alumni association known as The Old Burians. The Old Burians Charitable Trust, set up in 1997, provides financial support to current and former students for personal development projects.

== Headteachers ==
- 1553–c1560 John Fenn (deprived of office)
- c1670 Edward Leedes
- 1788 –1809 Michael Thomas Becher
- 1809–1828 Benjamin Heath Malkin
- 1828–1841 John Edwards
- 1841–1855 John William Donaldson
- 1855–1879 Albert Henry Wratislaw
- 1879–1890 Charles Sankey (left to become a House Master at Harrow)
- 1890–1894 James Peile
- 1894–1908 Arthur Wright Callis
- 1908–1911 E T England
- 1911–1923 B S Richards
- 1923–1940? J M Wadmore
- 1940?–1970 Robert Elliott
- 1970–1981 David Pullan (died in office)
- 1981–2002 Michael W Moran
- 2002–2017 Geoff Barton (subsequently General Secretary of the Association of School and College Leaders)
- 2017–2021 Lee Walker
- 2021–2022 Beverley Tucker and Tom Grey (interim)
- 2022–2026 Deri O'Regan
- 2026 - present Tom Grey

== Notable alumni ==
- Chris Auchinvole – New Zealand politician
- John Battely – Archdeacon of Canterbury
- Charles James Blomfield – Bishop of London
- Edward Valentine Blomfield – classicist
- Edmund Boulnois – businessman and politician
- Horace Browne – cricketer and barrister
- James Burrough – architect
- Robert Butts – Bishop of Ely
- Charlie Carrel – Professional poker player and coach
- Thomas Clerke – MP
- Thomas Collins – cricketer
- Richard Cumberland – dramatist
- Thomas Curteis – cricketer and clergyman
- Sir Charles Davers, Bt – politician
- Sir Robert Davers, Bt – explorer
- Robert Dewing – cricketer and army officer
- Edward FitzGerald – Poet and Translator of Rubáiyát of Khayyám
- Roy Flatt – dean of Argyll and The Isles
- Edward Greene – founder of Greene King brewery
- John Hervey, 1st Earl of Bristol – politician and peer
- Charles Jenyns – cricketer
- John Mitchell Kemble – historian
- Basil Charles King – geologist
- Jack Lankester – professional footballer
- General Charles Lee – general in US Continental Army
- William Mather – cricketer
- Dudley Long North – politician
- Henry Perkins – cricketer, brother of the below
- John Perkins – cricketer, brother of the above
- Jocelyn Pook – musician and composer
- James Poulson – cricketer
- Edward Romilly – cricketer, MP for Ludlow and chairman of the Board of Audit
- William Sancroft – 79th Archbishop of Canterbury
- Richard Sibbes – Puritan theologian
- Mercer Simpson – writer
- Mark Smith – Vice Chancellor of Lancaster University
- Sir William Spring, Bt – politician
- Stephen Spring Rice - philanthropist
- George Pretyman Tomline – theologian and Bishop of Lincoln
- Ed Upson – professional footballer
- Chris Walker-Hebborn – Commonwealth Games gold medallist swimmer
- John Walsham – diplomat
- Sir Thomas Watson – President of Royal College of Physicians, physician to queen
- John Winthrop the Younger – governor of Connecticut
- Frank Wise – diplomat economist and politician; Labour MP, 1929–31
