= List of Catholic martyrs of the English Reformation =

The Catholic martyrs of the English Reformation are men and women executed under treason legislation in the English Reformation, between 1534 and 1680, and recognised as martyrs by the Catholic Church. Though consequences of the English Reformation were felt in Ireland and Scotland as well, this article only covers those who died in the Kingdom of England.

On 25 February 1570, Pope Pius V's "Regnans in Excelsis" bull excommunicated the English Queen Elizabeth I, and any who obeyed her. This papal bull released her subjects from allegiance to her. In response, in 1571 legislation was enacted making it treasonable to be under the authority of the pope, including being a Jesuit, being Catholic or harbouring a Catholic priest. The standard penalty for men convicted of treason at the time was execution by being hanged, drawn and quartered. Women were burned at the stake.

In the reign of Pope Gregory XIII (1572–85), authorisation was given for 63 recognised martyrs to have their relics honoured and pictures painted for Catholic devotions. These martyrs were formally beatified by Pope Leo XIII, 54 in 1886 and the remaining nine in 1895. Further groups of martyrs were subsequently documented and proposed by the Catholic bishops of England and Wales and formally recognised by Rome.

== Numbers in various categories ==
In 1874 a process was begun, containing 353 names, to which six were added in Rome, making 359. Of those:

1. 54 were beatified in 1886, of whom two were canonized in 1935, and 11 in 1970.
2. 9 were beatified in 1895.
3. One (Oliver Plunkett) was beatified in 1920, and canonized in 1975.
4. 136 were beatified in 1929, of whom 29 were canonized in 1970
5. 85 were beatified in 1987.
6. (So 285 were beatified at various times, of whom 43 were subsequently canonised).
7. 30 were declared venerable, of whom one, John Travers, was executed in Dublin and appears in Irish Catholic Martyrs.
8. (So 315 were declared venerable, of whom 285 were subsequently beatified).
9. 44 were postponed ("dilati") – 36 died in prison and 8 were postponed for other reasons.

== Saints ==
=== Canonised on 19 May 1935 ===
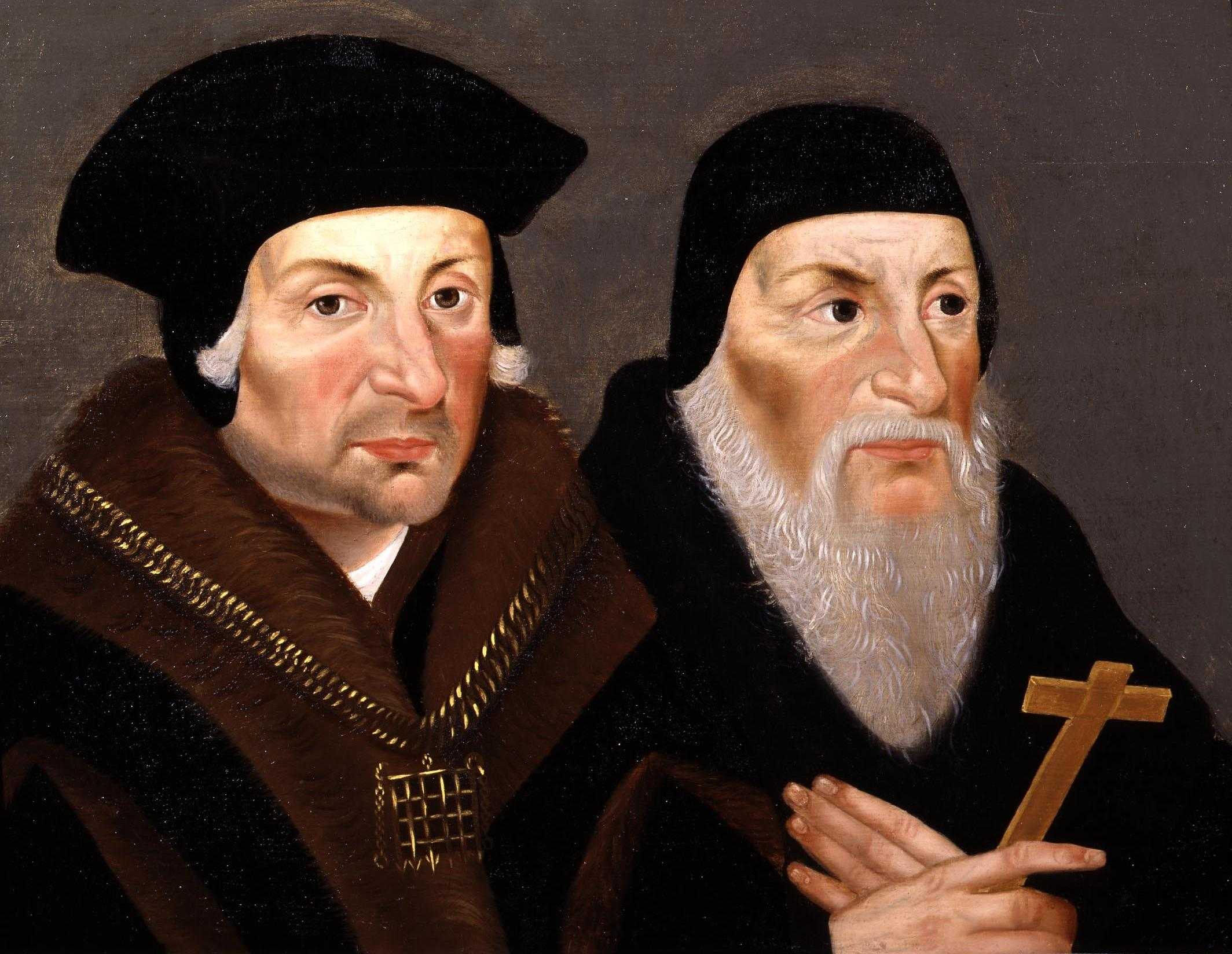
Sir Thomas More and Bishop John Fisher

1. John Fisher (1469–1535), Bishop of Rochester; Cardinal (Yorkshire – London, England)
2. Thomas More, (1478–1535), married layman of the Archdiocese of Westminster (London, England)

=== Canonised on 25 October 1970 ===
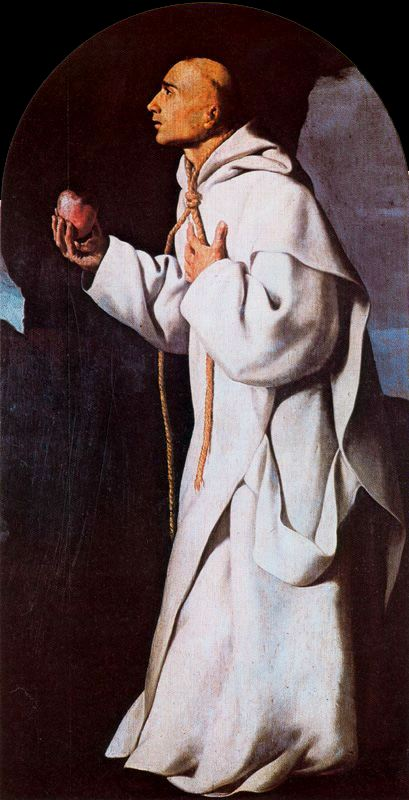
John Houghton

1. John Houghton (c. 1487–1535), priest of the Carthusian order (Essex – London, England)
2. Robert Lawrence (c. 1485–1535), priest of the Carthusian order (London, England)
3. Augustine Webster (died 1535), priest of the Carthusian order (London, England)
4. Richard Reynolds (c. 1492–1535), priest of the Bridgettine order (Devon – London, England)
5. John Stone (died 1539), priest of the Augustinian order (Kent, England)
6. Cuthbert Mayne (c. 1544–1577), priest of the Diocese of Plymouth (Devon – Cornwall, England)
7. Edmund Campion (c. 1540–1581), Jesuit priest (London, England)
8. Ralph Sherwin (c. 1550–1581), priest of the Diocese of Nottingham (Derby – London, England)
9. Alexander Briant (c. 1556–1581), Jesuit priest (Somerset – London, England)
10. John Payne (1532–1582), priest of the Diocese of Brentwood (Northampton – Essex, England)
11. Luke Kirby (c. 1549–1582), priest of the Diocese of Middlesbrough (North Yorkshire – London, England)
12. Richard Gwyn (alias Richard White) (c. 1537–1584), married layman of the Diocese of Wrexham (Powys – Clwyd, Wales)
13. Margaret Clitherow née Middleton (1556–1586), married laywoman of the Diocese of Middlesbrough (North Yorkshire, England)
14. Margaret Ward (c. 1550–1588), laywoman of the Diocese of Shrewsbury (Cheshire – London, England)
15. Edmund Gennings (1567–10 December 1591), priest of the Archdiocese of Birmingham (Staffordshire – London, England)
16. Swithin Wells (1536– 10 December 1591), married layman of the Diocese of Portsmouth (Hampshire – London, England)
17. Eustace White (1559–10 December 1591), priest of the Diocese of Nottingham (Lincolnshire – London, England)
18. Polydore Plasden (1563–10 December 1591), priest of the Archdiocese of Westminster (London, England)
19. John Boste (1543–1594), priest of the Diocese of Lancaster (Cumbria – London, England)
20. Robert Southwell (1561–1595), Jesuit priest (Norfolk – London, England)
21. Henry Walpole (1558–1595), Jesuit priest (Norfolk – North Yorkshire, England)
22. Philip Howard, Earl of Arundel (1557–1595), married layman of the Diocese of Arundel and Brighton (London, England)
23. John Griffith (alias Jones, Buckley, or Griffith, or Godfrey Maurice) (1559–1598), priest of the Franciscan Friars Minor (Observants) (Gwynedd, Wales – London, England)
24. John Rigby (c. 1570–1600), layman of the Archdiocese of Liverpool (Lancashire – London, England)
25. Anne Line née Higham (c. 1565–1601), married laywoman of the Diocese of Brentwood (Essex – London, England)
26. Nicholas Owen (c. 1550–1606), Jesuit (Oxfordshire – London, England)
27. Thomas Garnet (1575–1608), Jesuit priest (London, England)
28. John Roberts (c. 1576–1610), priest of the Benedictine order (English Congregation) (Gwynedd, Wales – London, England)
29. John Almond (c. 1577–1612), priest of the Archdiocese of Liverpool (Merseyside – London, England)
30. Edmund Arrowsmith (1585–1628), Jesuit priest (Lancashire, England)
31. Edward Barlow (Ambrose) (1585–1641), priest of the Benedictine order (English Congregation) (Lancashire, England)
32. Bartholomew Roe (Alban) (1583–1642), priest of the Benedictine order(English Congregation) (Suffolk – London, England)
33. Henry Morse (1595–1645), Jesuit priest (Suffolk – London, England)
34. John Southworth (1592–1654), priest of the Archdiocese of Westminster (Lancashire – London, England)
35. John [William] Plessington (c. 1637–1679), priest of the Diocese of Lancaster (Lancashire – Cheshire, England)
36. Philip Evans (c. 1645–1679), Jesuit priest (Monmouthshire – Cardiff, Wales)
37. John Lloyd (c. 1630–1679), priest of the Diocese of Menevia (Powys – Cardiff, Wales)
38. John Wall (Joachim of Saint Anne) (c. 1620–1679), priest of the Franciscan Friars Minor (Recollects) (Lancashire – Worcestershire, England)
39. John Kemble (1599–1679), priest of the Archdiocese of Cardiff (Herefordshire, England)
40. David Lewis (1616–1679), Jesuit priest (Monmouthshire, England)

=== Canonised on 12 October 1975 ===
1. Oliver Plunkett (1625–1681), Archbishop of Armagh (Meath, Ireland – London, England)

=== Canonised on 17 October 1976 ===
1. John Ogilvie (1579–1615), Jesuit priest (Moray – Glasgow, Scotland)

== Blesseds ==
=== Beatified on 29 December 1886 ===
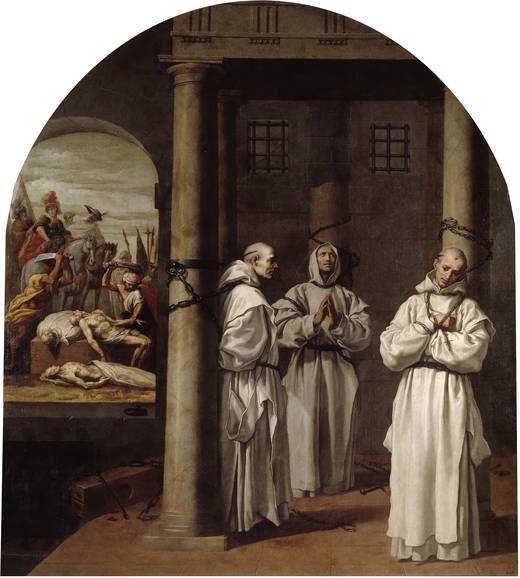
Carthusian martyrs of London, Nottingham and Axholme

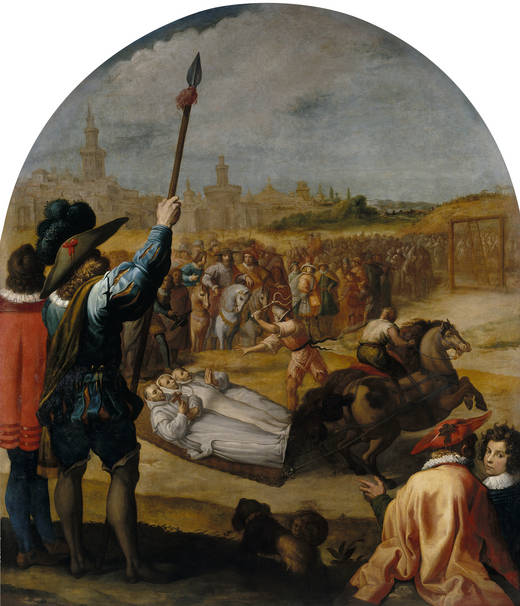
Martyrdom of Humphrey Middlemore, William Exmew and Sebastian Newdigate

As well as those listed below, John Fisher and Thomas More were beatified on this date, as were 11 members (Note: The 11 canonized martyrs were Alexander Briant, Edmund Campion, John Houghton, Luke Kirby, Robert Lawrence, Cuthbert Mayne, John Payne, Richard Reynolds, Ralph Sherwin, John Stone, and Augustine Webster) of the Forty Martyrs of England and Wales, making a total of 54.

Order of Carthusians

1. William Exmew (died 1535), priest of the Carthusian order (London, England)
2. Humphrey Middlemore (died 1535), priest of the Carthusian order (Birmingham – London, England)
3. Sebastian Newdigate (died 1535), priest of the Carthusian order (Middlesex – London, England)
4. John Rochester (died 1537), priest of the Carthusian order (Essex – North Yorkshire, England)
5. James Walworth (died 1537), priest of the Carthusian order (North Yorkshire, England)
6. William Greenwood (died 1537), priest of the Carthusian order (London, England)
7. John Davy (died 1537), Carthusian monk (London, England)
8. Robert Salt (died 1537), Carthusian monk (London, England)
9. Walter Pierson (died 1537), Carthusian monk (London, England)
10. Thomas Green (died 1537), priest of the Carthusian order (London, England)
11. Thomas Scryven (died 1537), Carthusian monk (London, England)
12. Thomas Redyng (died 1537), Carthusian monk (London, England)
13. Richard Bere (died 1537), priest of the Carthusian order (Somerset – London, England)
14. Thomas Johnson (died 1537), priest of the Carthusian order (London, England)
15. William Horne (died 1540), Carthusian monk (London, England)

Diocesan Clergy

1. John Haile (or Hale) (died 1535), priest of the Archdiocese of Westminster (London, England)
2. Thomas Abel (died 1540), priest of the Archdiocese of Westminster (London, England)
3. Edward Powell (died 1540), priest of the Diocese of Clifton (Wales – London, England)
4. Richard Fetherston (died 1540), priest of the Diocese of Menevia (London, England)
5. John Larke (died 1544), priest of the Archdiocese of Westminster (London, England)
6. Thomas Plumtree (died 1570), priest of the Diocese of Hexham and Newcastle (Lincolnshire – Durham, England)
7. Everard Hanse (died 1581), priest of the Diocese of Northampton (Northamptonshire – London, England)
8. Thomas Ford (died 1582), Priest of the Diocese of Plymouth (Devon – London, England)
9. John Shert (died 1582), priest of the Diocese of Shrewsbury (Cheshire – London, England)
10. Robert Johnson (died 1582), priest of the Diocese of Shrewsbury (Shropshire – London, England)
11. William Filby (died 1582), priest of the Archdiocese of Birmingham (Oxfordshire – London, England)
12. Lawrence Richardson (also known as Lawrence Johnson) (died 1582), priest of the Archdiocese of Liverpool (Lancashire – London, England)
13. William Lacy (or Lacey) (died 1582), priest of the Diocese of Leeds (North Yorkshire, England)
14. Richard Kirkman (died 1582), priest of the Diocese of Leeds (North Yorkshire, England)
15. James Tompson (died 1582), priest of the Diocese of Middlesbrough (North Yorkshire, England)
16. William Hart (died 1583), priest of the Diocese of Clifton (Somerset – North Yorkshire, England)
17. Richard Thirkeld (died 1583), priest of the Diocese of Hexham and Newcastle (Durham – North Yorkshire, England)

Society of Jesus (Jesuits)

1. Thomas Woodhouse (1535–1573), Jesuit priest (Lincolnshire – London, England)
2. John Nelson (died 1578), Jesuit priest (Yorkshire – London, England)
3. Thomas Cottam (1549–1582), Jesuit priest (Lancashire – London, England)

Franciscan Friars Minor (Observants)

1. John Forest (died 1538), priest of the Franciscan Friars Minor (Observants) (London, England)

Roman Catholic Laity

1. Margaret Pole, Countess of Salisbury (1473–1541), married laywoman of the Diocese of Portsmouth (Somerset – London, England)
2. German Gardiner (died 1544), layman of the Archdiocese of Southwark (London, England)
3. John Felton (died 1570), married layman of the Archdiocese of Southwark (London, England)
4. John Storey (died 1571), married layman of the Diocese of Clifton (Wiltshire – London, England)
5. Thomas Sherwood (1551–1578), layman of the Archdiocese of Westminster (London, England)

=== Beatified on 13 May 1895 ===
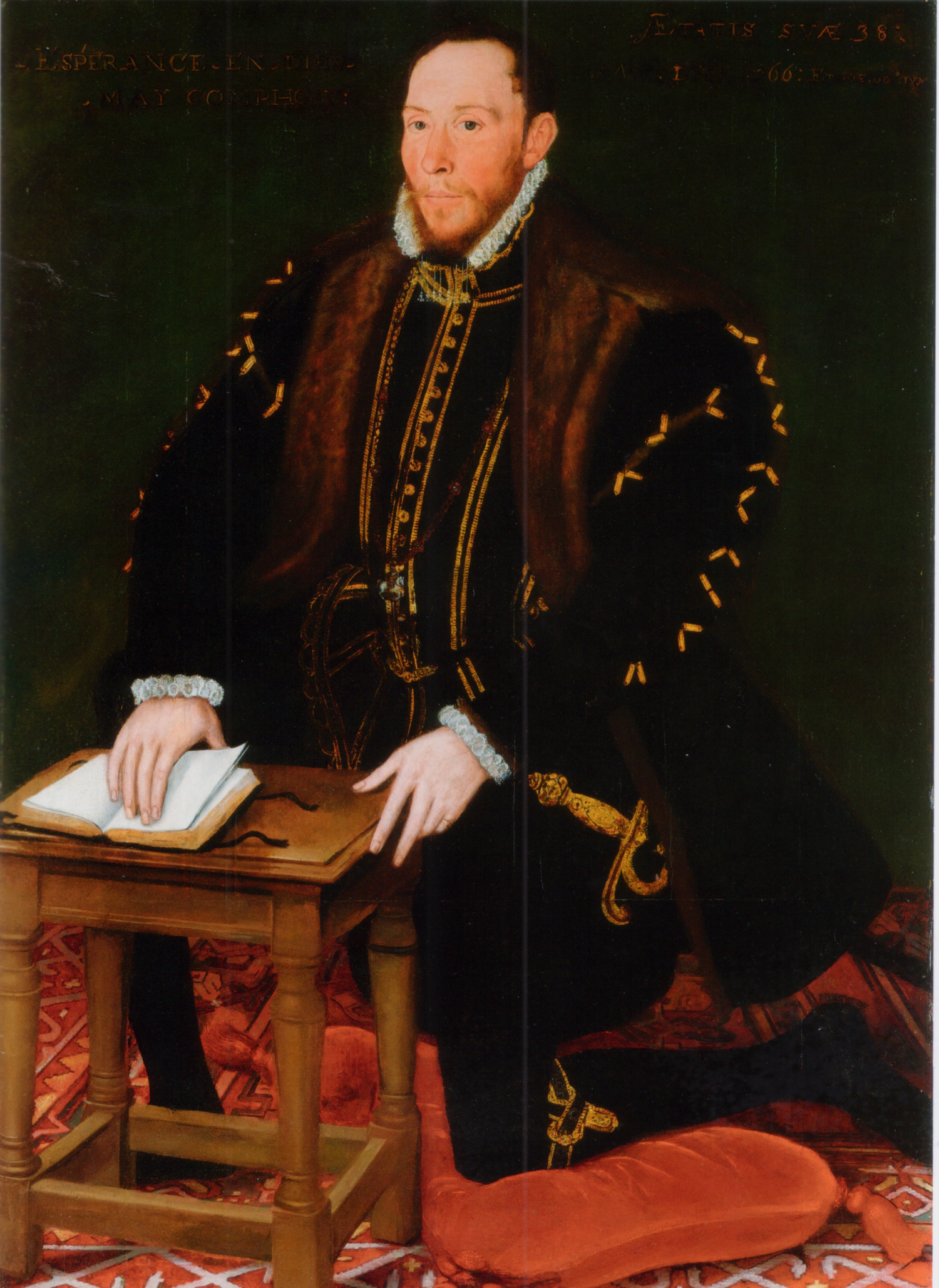
Sir Thomas Percy, 7th Earl of Northumberland

1. Adrian Fortescue (c. 1480–1539), married layman of the Archdiocese of Westminster; Member of the Lay Dominicans and Knights of Saint John of Jerusalem (Hertfordshire – London, England)
2. Richard Whiting (died 1539), priest of the Benedictine order (English Congregation); Abbot of Glastonbury (Somerset, England)
3. John Thorne (died 1539), priest of the Benedictine order (English Congregation) (Somerset, England)
4. Roger James (died 1539), priest of the Benedictine order (English Congregation) (Somerset, England)
5. Hugh Cook Faringdon (died 1539), priest of the Benedictine order (English Congregation); Abbot of Reading (Berkshire, England)
6. William Eynon (John) (died 1539), priest of the Benedictine order (English Congregation) (Berkshire, England)
7. John Rugg (or Rugge) (died 1539), priest of the Benedictine order (English Congregation) (Berkshire, England)
8. John Beche (or Thomas Marshall) (died 1539), priest of the Benedictine order (English Congregation); Abbot of Colchester (Essex, England)
9. Thomas Percy, Earl of Northumberland (1528–1572), married layman of the Diocese of Hexham and Newcastle (Northumberland – North Yorkshire, England)

=== Beatified on 15 December 1929 ===
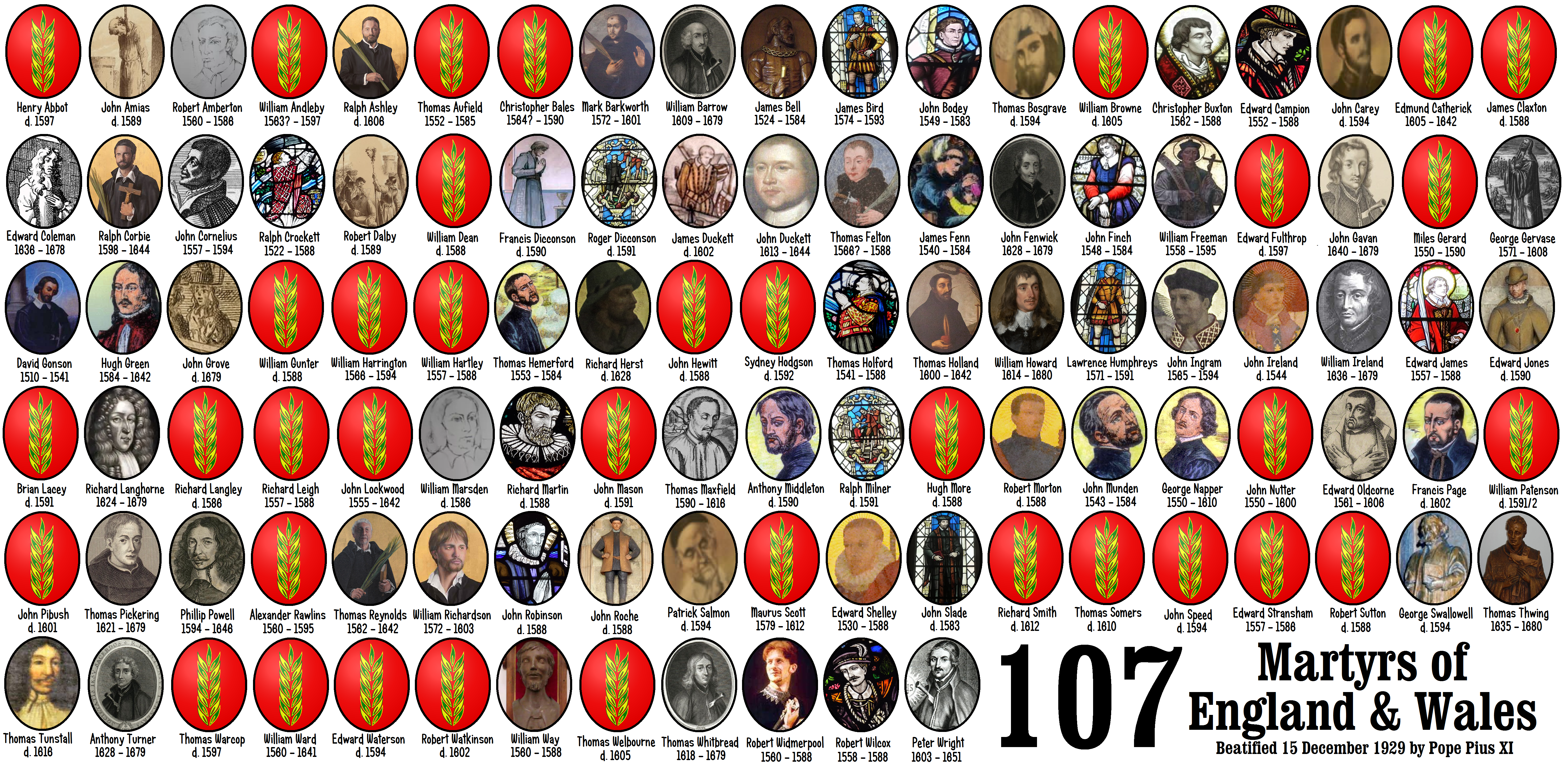
One Hundred and Seven Martyrs of England and Wales

As well as those listed below, 29 members (Note: The 29 martyrs who were canonized were John Almond, Edmund Arrowsmith, Ambrose Barlow, John Boste, Margaret Clitherow, Philip Evans, Thomas Garnet, Edmund Gennings, John Griffith, Richard Gwyn, Philip Howard, Earl of Arundel, John Kemble, David Lewis, Anne Line, John Lloyd, Henry Morse, Nicholas Owen, Polydore Plasden, John Plessington, John Rigby, John Roberts, Alban Roe, John Southworth, Robert Southwell, John Wall, Henry Walpole, Margaret Ward, Swithin Wells and Eustace White) of the Forty Martyrs of England and Wales were also beatified on that date, making a total of 136. This beatification was attended by G.K. Chesterton as detailed in his book The Resurrection of Rome.

1. Henry Abbot, layman, 4 July 1597
2. John Amias, priest, 16 March 1589
3. Robert Anderton, priest, 25 April 1586.
4. William Andleby, priest, 4 July 1597
5. Ralph Ashley, Jesuit priest, 7 April 1607
6. Thomas Aufield, priest, 6 July 1585
7. Christopher Bales, priest, 4 March 1590
8. Mark Barkworth, Benedictine, 27 February 1601
9. William Barrow, alias William Harcourt, 20 June 1679
10. James Bell, priest, 1584
11. James Bird (or Byrd or Beard), layman, 25 March 1592
12. John Bodey, priest, 2 November 1583
13. Thomas Bosgrave, layman, 4 July 1594
14. William Browne, layman, 5 September 1605
15. Christopher Buxton, priest, died Canterbury, 1 October 1588
16. Edward Campion (also known as Gerard Edwards), 1 October 1588
17. John Carey, Dublin born lay helper of John Cornelius S.J., 4 July 1594
18. Edmund Catherick, priest, 1642
19. James Claxton (Clarkson), priest, 1588
20. Edward Colman (or Coleman), layman, 1678
21. Ralph Corbie, Jesuit, 7 September 1644
22. John Cornelius, Jesuit priest, 4 July 1594
23. Ralph Crockett, priest, 1 October 1588
24. Robert Dalby, priest, York, 16 March 1589
25. William Dean, priest, 28 August 1588
26. Francis Dicconson, priest, 1590
27. Roger Dicconson, priest, 7 July 1591
28. James Duckett, layman, 1602
29. John Duckett, priest, 1644
30. Thomas Felton, Franciscan, 1588
31. James Fenn, priest, 1584
32. John Fenwick, Jesuit priest, 1679
33. John Finch, 1584
34. William Freeman, priest, 1595
35. Edward Fulthrop, layman, 1597
36. John Gavan, Jesuit priest, 1679
37. Miles Gerard, priest, 1590
38. George Gervase, Benedictine, 1608
39. David Gonson (or Gunston), professed Knight in the Order of St John, 12 July 1541
40. Hugh Green, priest, 1642
41. John Grove, layman, 24 January 1679
42. William Gunter, priest, 1588
43. William Harrington, priest, 1594
44. William Hartley, priest, 1588
45. Thomas Hemerford, priest, 1584
46. Richard Herst (Hurst), layman, 29 August 1628
47. John Hewitt (alias Weldon, alias Savell), priest, 1588
48. Sydney Hodgson, layman, 10 December 1591
49. Thomas Holford, priest, 1588
50. Thomas Holland, priest, 12 December 1642
51. Laurence Humphreys (or Humphrey), layman, 7 July 1591
52. John Ingram, priest, 1594
53. John Ireland, priest, 7 March 1544
54. William Ireland, Jesuit priest, 1679
55. Edward James, priest, 1588
56. Edward Jones, priest, 1590
57. Brian Lacey, layman, 10 December 1591
58. Richard Langhorne, layman, 1679
59. Richard Langley, layman, 1586
60. Richard Leigh, priest, 1588
61. John Lockwood, priest, 1642
62. William Marsden, priest, 25 April 1586
63. Richard Martin, layman, 30 August 1588
64. John Mason, layman, 1591
65. Thomas Maxfield, priest, 1616
66. Anthony Middleton, priest, 1590
67. Ralph Milner, layman, 7 July 1591
68. Hugh More, layman, 28 August 1588
69. Robert Morton, priest, 1588
70. John Munden, priest, 1584
71. George Napper (alias Napier), priest, Oxford, 1610
72. John Nutter, priest, 1584
73. Edward Oldcorne, Jesuit priest, 1606
74. Francis Page, Jesuit, 1602
75. William Patenson, priest, 1592
76. John Pibush, priest, 1601
77. Thomas Pickering, Benedictine, 1679
78. Philip Powell, Benedictine, 1646
79. Alexander Rawlins, priest, 1595
80. Thomas Reynolds, priest, 21 January 1642
81. William Richardson, priest, 1603
82. John Robinson, priest, 1 October 1588
83. John Roche, layman, 1588
84. Patrick Salmon, layman, 4 July 1594
85. Maurus Scott (William Scot) 1612
86. Edward Shelley, 30 August 1588,
87. John Slade, layman, 1583
88. Richard Smith, (also known as Richard Newport), priest, 1612
89. Thomas Somers, priest, 1610
90. John Speed, layman, 4 February 1594
91. William Howard, 1st Viscount Stafford, layman, 29 December 1680
92. Edward Stransham, priest, 1586
93. Robert Sutton, layman, 5 October 1588
94. George Swallowell, layman, 26 July 1594
95. Thomas Thwing, priest, 1679
96. Thomas Tunstall, priest, 1616
97. Anthony Turner, Jesuit, 1679
98. Thomas Warcop, layman, 4 July 1597
99. William Ward, priest, 1641
100. Edward Waterson, priest, 1593
101. Robert Watkinson, priest, 1602
102. William Way (alias May or Flower), priest, 1588
103. Thomas Welbourne, layman, 1 August 1605
104. Thomas Whitbread, Jesuit, 1679
105. Robert Widmerpool, layman, 1 October 1588
106. Robert Wilcox, priest, 1 October 1588
107. Peter Wright, Jesuit, 1651

=== Beatified 22 November 1987 by Pope John Paul II ===
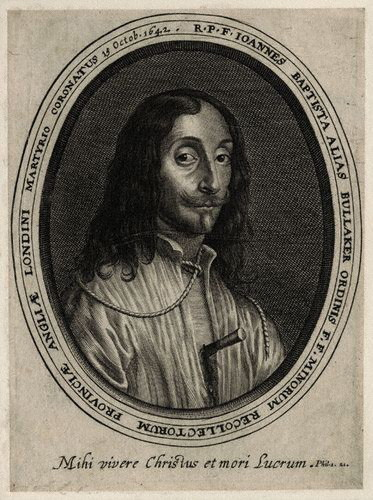
Thomas Bullaker

1. John Adams, priest, 8 October 1586
2. Thomas Atkinson, priest, 1616
3. Edward Bamber, priest, 1646
4. George Beesley, priest, 5 July 1591
5. Arthur Bell, Franciscan priest, 1643
6. Thomas Belson, layman, 5 July 1589
7. Robert Bickerdike, layman, 23 July 1586
8. Alexander Blake, layman, 4 March 1590;
9. Marmaduke Bowes, layman, 26 November 1585
10. John Britton (alias Bretton), layman, 1 April 1598
11. Thomas Bullaker, Franciscan priest, 1642
12. Edward Burden, priest, 1588
13. Roger Cadwallador, priest, 1610
14. William Carter, layman, 11 January 1584
15. Alexander Crow, priest, 30 November 1587
16. William Davies, priest, 27 July 1593
17. Robert Dibdale, priest, 8 October 1586
18. George Douglas, priest, 1587
19. Robert Drury, priest, 1607
20. Edmund Duke, priest, 27 May 1590
21. George Errington, layman, 1596
22. Roger Filcock, priest, 1601
23. John Finglow (Fingley), priest, 8 August 1586
24. Matthew Flathers, priest, 1608
25. Richard Flower, layman, 1588
26. Nicholas Garlick, priest, 1588
27. William Gibson, layman, 1596
28. Ralph Grimston, layman, 1598
29. Robert Grissold, layman, 1604
30. John Hambley, priest, 1587
31. Robert Hardesty, layman, 1589
32. George Haydock, priest, 12 February 1584
33. Henry Heath, Franciscan priest, 1643
34. Richard Hill, priest, 27 May 1590
35. John Hogg, priest, 27 May 1590
36. Richard Holiday, priest, 27 May 1590
37. Nicholas Horner, layman, 4 March 1590
38. Thomas Hunt, priest, 1600
39. Thurstan Hunt, priest, 1601
40. Francis Ingleby, priest, 3 June 1586
41. William Knight, layman, 1596
42. Joseph Lambton, priest, 24 July 1592
43. William Lampley, layman, 1588
44. John Lowe, priest, 8 October 1586
45. Robert Ludlam, priest, 1588
46. Charles Mahoney (alias Meehan), Franciscan priest, 1679
47. Robert Middleton, priest, March 1601
48. George Nichols, priest, 1589
49. John Norton, layman, 1600
50. Robert Nutter, priest, 1600
51. Edward Osbaldeston, priest, 1594
52. Anthony Page, priest, 1593
53. Thomas Palasor, priest, 1600
54. William Pike, layman, 22 December 1591
55. Thomas Pilchard, priest, 21 March 1587
56. Thomas Pormort, priest, 20 February 1592
57. Nicholas Postgate, priest, 1679
58. Humphrey Pritchard, layman, 1589
59. Christopher Robinson, priest, 1597
60. Stephen Rowsham, priest, 1587
61. John Sandys, priest, 11 August 1586
62. Montford Scott, priest, 2 July 1591
63. Richard Sergeant, priest, 2 April 1586
64. Richard Simpson, priest, 1588
65. Peter Snow, priest, 1598
66. William Southerne, priest, 1618
67. William Spenser, priest, 1589
68. Thomas Sprott, priest, 1600
69. John Sugar, priest, 1604
70. Robert Sutton, priest, 1587
71. Edmund Sykes, priest, 23 March 1587
72. John Talbot, layman, 1600
73. Hugh Taylor, priest, 25 November 1585
74. William Thomson, priest, 20 April 1586
75. Robert Thorpe, priest, 15 May 1591
76. John Thulis, priest, 18 Mar 1616
77. Edward Thwing, priest, 26 July 1600
78. Thomas Watkinson, layman, 31 May 1591
79. Henry Webley, 28 August 1588
80. Christopher Wharton, priest, 1600
81. Thomas Whitaker, priest, 1646
82. John Woodcock, Franciscan priest, 7 August 1646
83. Nicholas Woodfen, priest, 21 January 1586
84. Roger Wrenno, layman, 1616
85. Richard Yaxley, priest, 1589

== Venerables ==
=== Declared venerable in 1886 and not subsequently beatified ===
1. Thomas Ashby, layman, 19 March 1544 – "there was some doubt that he died as a Catholic"
2. Roger Ashton, soldier, 23 June 1592 – assisted Sir William Stanley in the surrender of Deventer to Spain
3. Laurence Bailey, layman, August 1604
4. Anthony Bates (alias Battie), layman, 22 March 1602
5. Thomas Bedingfeld (also known as Thomas Downes), 21 December 1678 (died in prison)
6. Thomas Belchiam, Franciscan friar, 3 August 1538:
7. Edmund Brindholme, priest, 4 August 1540
8. Anthony Brookby, Franciscan, 7 July 1537:
9. Brian Cansfield (or Tansfield), 3 August 1645 (died of ill-treatment in prison)
10. Thomas Cort, Franciscan, 27 July 1538:
11. Sir Thomas Dingley, layman, 9 July 1539
12. James Dowdall, layman, 13 August 1598
13. John Goodman, priest, 8 April 1642 (died in prison)
14. John Griffith (or Clark), priest, 8 July 1539
15. Thomas Hackshott (alias Hawkshaw), layman, 24 August 1601
16. James Harrison, priest, 22 March 1602
17. Richard Horner, priest, 4 September 1598
18. Francis Levison, Franciscan, 11 February 1680 (died in prison)
19. John Lyon, layman, 16 July 1599
20. Edward Mico, Jesuit, 1678 (arrested, but too ill to be removed from sick-bed, where he died)
21. Edward Morgan, priest, 26 April 1642
22. Francis Nevil, Jesuit, February 1679 (died in prison)
23. Clement Philpott (or Philpot), layman, 4 August 1540
24. Robert Price (alias Aprece), layman, shot by Puritan soldiers, 7 May 1644
25. Nicholas Tichborne, layman, 24 August 1601
26. Thomas Tichborne, priest, 20 April 1602
27. Friar Waire, Franciscan, 8 July 1539
28. Thomas Webley, layman, 6 July 1585
29. Richard Williams, priest, 21 February 1592

As stated above, John Travers was executed in Dublin and appears in Irish Catholic Martyrs. The total number of those declared venerable in 1886 and not subsequently beatified is therefore 30.

== Dilati ==
They "were left with their fate still in suspense, and are called Dilati. [36 of them were] "Confessors", who certainly died in prison for their faith, though it is not yet proven that they died precisely because of their imprisonment...[the remaining eight – William Tyrrwhit, James Atkinson, Matthias Harrison, Fr. Henry Garnet, S.J., John Mawson, Thomas Dyer, Lawrence Hill and Robert Green] were put off for various causes." Those 'put off' are listed below in italics.

1. Robert Dymoke, layman, 1580 (died in prison)
2. John Cooper, layman, 1580 (died in prison)
3. William Tyrwhit, layman, 1580 (died in prison – named by error for his brother Robert)
4. William Chaplin, seminary priest, 1583 (died in prison)
5. Thomas Cotesmore, priest, 1584 (died in prison)
6. Robert Holmes, priest, 1584 (died in prison)
7. Roger Wakeman, priest, 1584 (died in prison)
8. James Lomax, priest, 1584 (died in prison)
9. Mr Ailworth, layman, 1584 (died in prison)
10. Thomas Crowther, priest, 1585 (died in prison)
11. Edward Pole, priest, 1585 (died in prison)
12. Laurence Vaux, priest, 1585 (died in prison)
13. John Jetter, priest, 1585 (died in prison)
14. John Harrison, priest, 1586 (died in prison)
15. Martin Sherson, priest, 1587 (died in prison)
16. Gabriel Thimelby, layman, 1587 (died in prison)
17. Thomas Metham, Jesuit, 1592 (died in prison)
18. James Atkinson, layman, 1595 ("killed under torture by Topcliffe, but evidence is wanted of his constancy to the end")
19. Matthew/Matthias Harrison, seminary priest, 1599 (not yet sufficiently distinguished from James Harrison)
20. Eleanor Hunt, widow, 1600 (died in prison)
21. Alice Wells, widow, 1602 (died in prison)
22. Henry Garnet, Jesuit, executed 1606 ("was he killed ex odio fidei, or was he believed to be guilty of the Powder Plot, by merely human misjudgment, not through religious prejudice?")
23. John Mawson, layman, executed 1614 (not yet sufficiently distinguished from John Mason, 1591) 10 December 1591
24. Thomas Dyer, Benedictine, c.1618–1630 – his identity 'has not been fully proved'
25. Edward Wilkes, priest, 1642 (died in prison)
26. Boniface Kemp, priest, OSB, 1642 (died in prison)
27. Ildephonse Hesketh (alias William Hanson), Benedictine, 1642 (died in prison)
28. Thomas Vaughan, priest, probably 1644 (died in prison)
29. Richard Bradley, Jesuit, 1645 (died in prison)
30. John Felton, priest, SJ, 1646 (died in prison)
31. Thomas Blount, priest, probably 1646 (died in prison)
32. Robert Cox, Benedictine, 1650 (died in prison)
33. Laurence Hill, layman, 1679 (Was it due to odium fidei, or an unprejudiced error?)
34. Robert Green, layman, 1679 (Was it due to odium fidei, or an unprejudiced error?)
35. Thomas Jennison, Jesuit, 1679 (died in prison)
36. William Lloyd, seminary priest, 1679 (died in prison)
37. Placid Adelham, Benedictine, 1680 (died in prison)
38. Richard Birkett, priest, 1680 (died in prison)
39. Richard Lacey, Jesuit, 1680 (died in prison)
40. William Atkins, Jesuit, 1681 (died in prison)
41. Edward Turner, Jesuit, 1681 (died in prison)
42. William Allison, priest, 1681 (died in prison)
43. Benedict Constable, Benedictine, 1683 (died in prison)
44. William Bentney (alias Bennet), Jesuit, 1692 (died in prison)

== Executed for their faith in England 1534–1680 ==
=== 1534–1547 ===
During the reign of Henry VIII of England.

- John Allen, priest, 25 February 1538
- John Collins, priest, 1538
- George Croft, priest, 1538
- Martin Condres, Augustinian friar, December 1538:
- Paul of Saint William, Augustinian friar, December 1538:
- Thomas Empson (or Epson), Benedictine, 4 August 1540:
- Robert Bird, layman; 4 August 1540:
- William Bird, priest, 4 August 1540:
- William Peterson, priest, Commissary of Calais, Calais, 10 August 1540: or 10 April 1540

=== Decrees of Elizabeth I ===
During the reign of Mary I, papal authority was officially reinstated and under three hundred of the minority Protestant population were martyred. Upon Elizabeth I's accession to the throne, an Act of Supremacy denied papal authority over the English church; but only a decade later, in February 1570, did Pope Pius V excommunicate Elizabeth and any who obeyed her, issuing the bull Regnans in Excelsis, which purported to "release[ Elizabeth I's] subjects from their allegiance to her".

In the words of the New Catholic Encyclopedia, "Without question it was Elizabeth I's intention to supplant the old religion with the new in a bloodless manner. It is significant that there were no martyrs in the first 12 years of her reign, and only five in the years 1570 to 1577." Of those five, Thomas Plumtree had been chaplain to the insurgents in the Rising of the North, John Felton had published Pope Pius V's Bull Regnans in Excelsis ("reigning on high"), excommunicating Queen Elizabeth, John Story was tried for high treason, for having supported the Rising of the North and encouraging the Duke of Alba to invade, Thomas Percy, 7th Earl of Northumberland, had led the Rising of the North, and Thomas Woodhouse had declared in a letter to William Cecil that Elizabeth "for her own great disobedience is most justly deposed".

The threat of invasion by a Roman Catholic country assisted by English subjects led the Crown to try to repress Roman Catholicism. Responding to Pius V's action, Elizabeth I's government passed anti-Roman Catholic decrees in 1571 forbidding anyone from maintaining the jurisdiction of the pope by word, deed or act; requiring use of the Book of Common Prayer in all cathedrals, churches and chapels, and forbidding criticism of it; forbidding the publication of any bull, writing or instrument of the Holy See (the death penalty was assigned to this); and prohibiting the importing of Agnus Dei images, crosses, pictures, beads or other things from the Bishop of Rome.

Later laws made illegal the drawing of anyone away from the state church; non-attendance at a Church of England church; raising children with teachers who were not licensed by an Anglican diocesan bishop; and attending or celebrating the Roman Catholic Mass.

In 1585, a new decree made it a crime punishable by death to go overseas to receive the sacrament of Ordination to the Roman Catholic priesthood. Nicholas Devereux (who went by the alias of Nicholas Woodfen) and Edward Barber (see below Edward Stransham) were both put to death in 1586 under this law. William Thomson and Richard Lea (see below Richard Sergeant) were hanged, disembowelled and quartered under the same law. In 1588, eight priests and six laymen at Newgate were condemned and executed under this law.

=== 1570–1603 ===
- William Hambledon, priest, 1585
- John MacMahon, Jesuit priest, 1594

=== 1606–1680 ===
- James Brown, Benedictine, 1645
- Matthew S Patton, Covenanter, 19 Dec 1666

== Died in prison ==
- Thomas Vavasour, physician, May 2 1585
- Margaret Webster, recusant, May 1585
- Frances Webster, recusant, August 1585
- Richard Weston, recusant, 1586
- Robert Holland, recusant, June 1586
- Gabriel Empringham, recusant, September 1586
- Peter Lawson, recusant, September 1586
- Edmund Sexton, recusant, October 1586
- Henry Riston, recusant, November 1586
- Martin Sherson, priest, February 1587
- William Griffith, recusant, 1587
- Mary Hutton, recusant, October 25 1587
- Dorothy Vavasour, recusant, October 26 1587
- Alice Aldecorne (or Oldcorne), recusant, October 27 1587
- Thomas Wood, priest, before 1588
- Philip Lowe, recusant, April 1588
- John Jessop, recusant, 1588
- Mrs Tremaine, recusant, 1588
- Richard Bolbett, recusant, 1589
- Thomas Cosen, recusant, 1589
- Mrs Cosen, recusant, 1589
- Anne Launder (or Lawnder), recusant, Late 1589
- John Launder (or Lawnder), recusant, January 26 1590
- William Bredstock, recusant, 1590
- Mr Cumberford, recusant, 1590
- Mr Draycott, recusant, 1590
- Hugh Dutton, recusant, 1590
- Edward Ellis, recusant, 1590
- Mr Green, recusant, 1590
- David Gwynne, recusant, 1590
- William Heath, recusant, 1590
- Thomas Lynch, recusant, 1590
- John Thomas, recusant, 1590
- Ursula Forster, recusant, July 15 1590

== See also ==
- Elizabeth Barton#Arrest and execution
- Carthusian Martyrs
- Pilgrimage of Grace#Those executed after the Pilgrimage
- Irish Catholic Martyrs
- Marian persecutions
