= One Hundred and Seven Martyrs of England and Wales =

Group of beatified Catholic martyrs

Blessed Thomas Hemerford and One Hundred and Six Companion Martyrs
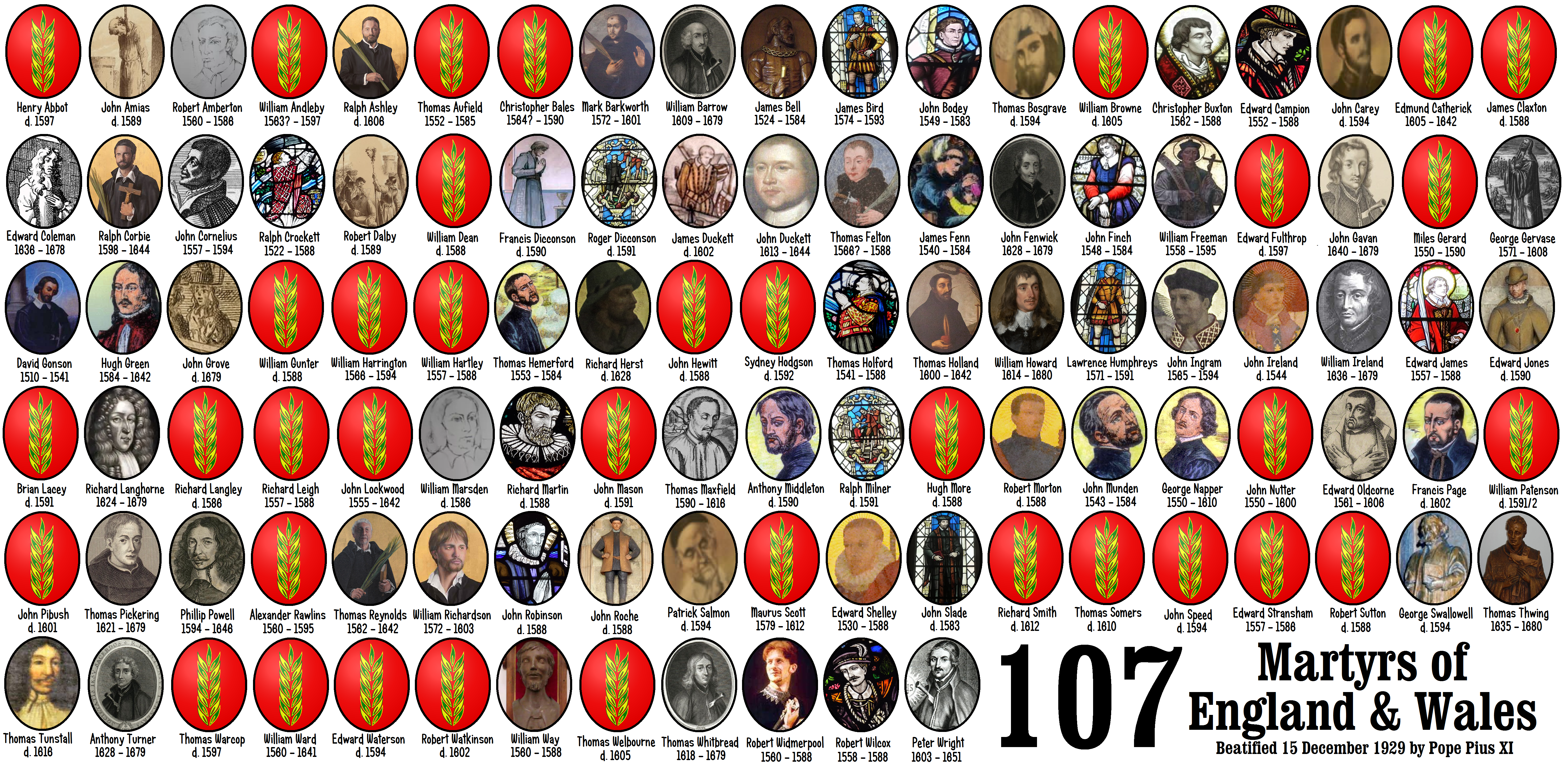
- Died: Between 12 July 1541 (David Gonson) – 29 December 1680 (William Howard, 1st Viscount Stafford), within England and Wales, many at Tyburn
- Venerated in: Roman Catholic Church
- Beatified: 15 December 1929, by Pope Pius XI
- Feast: 4 May, various for individual martyrs
- Attributes: martyr's palm knife in chest noose in neck book or bible crucifix chaucible Eucharist various religious habits crown of martyrdom

One Hundred and Seven Martyrs of England and Wales, also known as Thomas Hemerford and One Hundred and Six Companion Martyrs, are a group of clergy and laypersons who were executed on charges of treason and related offences in the Kingdom of England between 1541 and 1680. They are considered martyrs in the Roman Catholic Church and were beatified on 15 December 1929 by Pope Pius XI.

== List of individual names ==
They were chosen from a number of priests and laymen executed between 1584 and 1679.

Diocesan Clergy

1. John Ireland (died 7 March 1544)
2. Thomas Hemerford (c.1553 - 12 February 1584)
3. James Fenn (c.1540 - 12 February 1584)
4. John Nutter (died 12 February 1584)
5. John Munden (c.1543 - 12 February 1584)
6. James Bell (c. 1524 - 10 April 1584)
7. Thomas Alfield (Aufield) (c. 1552 - 6 July 1585)
8. Edward Stransham (c. 1557 - 21 January 1586)
9. Robert Anderton (c. 1560 - 25 April 1586)
10. William Marsden (died 25 April 1586)
11. William Dean (died 28 August 1588)
12. William Gunter (died 28 August 1588)
13. Robert Morton (died 28 August 1588)
14. Hugh More (died 28 August 1588)
15. Thomas Holford (c. 1541 - 28 August 1588)
16. James Claxton (died 28 August 1588)
17. Richard Leigh (c. 1557 - 28 August 1588)
18. William Way (c. 1560 - 23 September 1588)
19. Robert Wilcox (c. 1588 - 1 October 1588)
20. Edward Campion (Gerard Edwards) (c. 1552 - 1 October 1588)
21. Christopher Buxton (c. 1562 - 1 October 1588)
22. Ralph Crockett (c. 1522 - 1 October 1588)
23. Edward James (c. 1557 - 1 October 1588)
24. John Robinson (died 1 October 1588)
25. William Hartley (c. 1557 - 5 October 1588)
26. John Hewitt (Hewitt) (died 5 October 1588)
27. John Amias (died 15 March 1589)
28. Robert Dalby (died 15 March 1589)
29. Christopher Bales (c. 1564 - 4 March 1590)
30. Francis Dickenson (Dicconson) (c. 1564 - 13 April 1590)
31. Miles Gerard (c. 1550 - 13 April 1590)
32. Edward Jones (died 6 March 1590)
33. Anthony Middleton (died 6 March 1590)
34. Roger Dickenson (Dicconson) (died 7 July 1591)
35. William Patenson (died 22 January 1592)
36. Edward Waterson (died 8 January 1593)
37. William Harrington (c. 1566 - 18 February 1594)
38. John Ingram (c. 1565 - 26 July 1594)
39. Alexander Rawlins (died 7 April 1595)
40. William Freeman (c. 1558 - 13 August 1595)
41. William Andleby (c. 1563 - 4 July 1597)
42. John Pibush (died 18 February 1601)
43. Robert Watkinson (died 20 April 1602)
44. William Richardson (c. 1572 - 17 February 1603)
45. William Browne (died 5 September 1605)
46. George Napier (Napper) (c. 1550 - 9 November 1610)
47. Thomas Somers (died 10 December 1610)
48. Richard Newport (Smith) (died 30 May 1612)
49. Thomas Maxfield (c. 1590 - 1 July 1616)
50. Thomas Tunstall (died 13 July 1616)
51. William Ward (Webster) (c. 1560 - 26 July 1621)
52. Thomas Reynolds (Richard Green) (c. 1562 - 31 January 1642)
53. John Lockwood (Lascelles) (c. 1555 - 13 April 1642)
54. Edmund Catherick (c. 1605 - 13 April 1642)
55. Hugh Green (Ferdinand Brooke) (c. 1584 - 19 August 1642)
56. John Duckett (c. 1613 - 7 September 1644)
57. Thomas Thwing (c. 1635 - 23 October 1680)

Roman Catholic Laity

1. John Slade, tutor (died 30 October 1583)
2. John Bodey, academic jurist and lay theologian (c. 1549 - 2 November 1583)
3. John Finch, farmer (c. 1548 - 10 April 1584)
4. Richard Langley, condemned for sheltering Catholic priests (died 1 December 1586)
5. Edward Shelley, condemned for assisting a Catholic priest (c. 1530 - 30 August 1588)
6. Richard Martin, condemned for conversion and sheltering Catholic priests (died 30 August 1588)
7. John Roche, Irish-born boatman who assisted Margaret Ward in the escape of a priest (died 30 August 1588)
8. Robert Widmerpool, tutor, condemned for sheltering Catholic priests (c. 1560 - 1 October 1588)
9. Robert Sutton (died 5 October 1588)
10. Ralph Milner, father of a family, condemned for conversion (died 7 July 1591)
11. Laurence Humphrey (Humphreys), convert, condemned for speaking ill of Queen Elizabeth (c. 1571 - 7 July 1591)
12. Brian Lacey, condemned for attending Mass in Swithun Wells' house (died 10 December 1591)
13. John Mason, condemned for attending Mass in Swithun Wells' house (died 10 December 1591)
14. Sydney Hodgson, lawyer, condemned for attending Mass in Swithun Wells' house (died 10 December 1591)
15. James Bird (Byrd or Beard) (c. 1574 - 25 March 1592)
16. John Speed, condemned for assisting a Catholic priest (died 4 February 1594)
17. Thomas Bosgrave, relative to the Catholic Arundell family (died 4 July 1594)
18. John Carey, servant (died 4 July 1594)
19. Patrick Salmon, servant (died 4 July 1594)
20. George Swallowell, former Anglican minister, converted to Catholicism by John Ingram (died 26 July 1594)
21. Henry Abbot, convert (died 4 July 1597)
22. Thomas Warcop (died 4 July 1597)
23. Edward Fulthrop (died 4 July 1597)
24. James Duckett, convert, tailor, and publisher of Catholic devotionals (died 19 April 1602)
25. Thomas Welbourne, teacher (died 1 August 1605)
26. Richard Hurst (Herst), yeoman (died 29 August 1628)
27. Edward Coleman, courtier (17 May 1636 – 3 December 1678)
28. John Grove (died 24 January 1679)
29. Richard Langhorne, barrister (c. 1624 - 14 July 1679)
30. William Howard, nobleman (Viscount Stafford) (30 November 1614 – 29 December 1680)

Society of Jesus (Jesuits)

1. John Cornelius (Mohun) (c. 1557 - 4 July 1594)
2. Francis Page (died 20 April 1602)
3. Edward Oldcorne (Hall) (1561 - 7 April 1606)
4. Ralph Ashley (died 7 April 1606)
5. Thomas Holland (c. 1600 - 12 December 1642)
6. Ralph Corby (Corbie or Corbington) (25 March 1598 - 7 September 1644)
7. Peter Wright (c. 1603 - 19 May 1651)
8. William Ireland (Iremonger) (c. 1636 - 24 January 1679)
9. Thomas Whitbread (Harcourt) (c. 1618 - 20 June 1679)
10. William Harcourt (Barrow) (c. 1610 - 20 June 1679)
11. John Fenwick (Caldwell) (c. 1628 - 20 June 1679)
12. John Gavan (c. 1640 - 20 June 1679)
13. Anthony Turner (c. 1628 - 20 June 1679)

Order of Saint Benedict (Benedictines)

1. Mark Barkworth (Lambert) (c. 1572 - 27 February 1601)
2. George Gervase (c. 1571 - 11 April 1608)
3. William (Maurus) Scott (c. 1579 - 30 May 1612)
4. Philip Powell (Morgan) (2 February 1594 – 30 June 1646)
5. Thomas Pickering (c. 1621 - 9 May 1679)

Order of Minims (Minims)

1. Thomas Felton (c. 1566 - 28 August 1588)

Knights of Saint John of Jerusalem

1. David Gonson (Gunston) (c. 1510 - 12 July 1591)

== Liturgical Feast Day ==
In England these martyrs, together with those beatified between 1886 and 1929, are commemorated by a feast day on 4 May. This day also honours the Forty Martyrs of England and Wales who hold the rank of saint; the Forty Martyrs were honoured separately on 25 October until the liturgical calendar for England was revised in the year 2000.

In Wales, 4 May specifically commemorates the beatified martyrs of England and Wales. Three of the martyrs named in this group of 107 – William Gunter, Edward Jones, and Philip Powell – have Welsh connections.

== See also ==
- List of Catholic martyrs of the English Reformation
