= List of saints of the Society of Jesus =

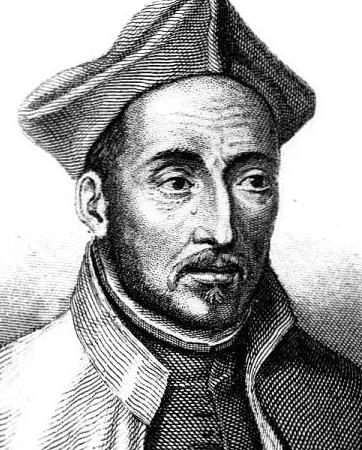
St. Ignatius of Loyola, recognized as a saint by the Catholic Church, founded the Society of Jesus in 1534.

The venerated members of the Society of Jesus (also known as the Jesuits) are listed here in order of date of death. The list includes Jesuit saints from Europe, Asia, Africa and the Americas. Since the founder of the Jesuits, St Ignatius of Loyola, was canonised in 1622, there have been 52 other Jesuits canonized and many more beatified or whose cause of canonization is still pending.

== Saints ==
=== Confessors ===
- Pierre Favre (13 April 1506 – 1 August 1546), first French Jesuit and co-founder of the Society, canonized on 17 December 2013
- Francis Xavier (7 April 1506 – 3 December 1552), co-founder of the Society, who led the first Christian mission to Japan, canonized on 12 March 1622
- Ignacio de Loyola (23 October 1491 – 31 July 1556), co-founder of the Society, canonized on 12 March 1622
- Stanisław Kostka (28 October 1550 – 15 August 1568), Polish novice, canonized on 31 December 1726
- Francesco Borgia (28 October 1510 – 30 September 1572), Duke of Gandia who later became a Jesuit priest and Third Superior General of the Society of Jesus, canonized on 20 June 1670
- Luigi Gonzaga (9 March 1568 – 21 June 1591), Italian, patron saint of young Christians, canonized on 31 December 1726
- José de Anchieta (19 March 1534 – 9 June 1597), Spanish missionary to Brazil, canonized on 3 April 2014
- Peter Canisius (8 May 1521 – 21 December 1597), significant figure in the Counter-Reformation, Doctor of the Church, canonized on 21 May 1925
- Bernardino Realino (1 December 1530 – 2 July 1616), Apostle of Lecce, canonized on 22 June 1947
- Alfonso Rodriguez (25 July 1532 – 31 October 1617), Jesuit brother, Spanish writer and mystic, canonized on 15 January 1888
- John Berchmans 13 March 1599 – 13 August 1621), Belgian seminarian, canonized on 15 January 1888
- Robert Bellarmine (4 October 1542 – 17 September 1621), Cardinal and Doctor of the Church, canonized on 29 June 1930
- Jean Francois Regis (31 January 1597 – 31 December 1640), French priest, canonized on 5 April 1737
- Pedro Claver (26 June 1580 – 8 September 1654), Spanish missionary in South America, canonized on 15 January 1888
- Claude de la Colombiere (2 February 1641 – 15 February 1682), Spiritual director and writer, canonized on 31 May 1992
- Francesco de Geronimo (17 December 1642 – 11 May 1716), Italian missionary, canonized on 26 May 1839
- Jose Maria Pignatelli (27 December 1737 – 15 November 1811), unofficial leader and eventual restorer of the Jesuits during the Suppression of the Society of Jesus, canonized on 12 June 1954
- Alberto Hurtado Cruchaga (22 January 1901 – 18 August 1952), Chilean social reformer, canonized on 23 October 2005
- José María Rubio (22 July 1864 – 2 May 1929), Apostle of Madrid, canonized on 4 May 2003

=== Martyrs of the English Reformation, canonized on 25 October 1970 as part of the Forty Martyrs of England and Wales ===
- Alexander Briant (17 August 1556 – 1 December 1581), priest
- Edmund Campion (25 January 1540 – 1 December 1581), priest and writer
- Robert Southwell (c. 1561 – 21 February 1595), priest and poet
- Henry Walpole (c. 1558 – 7 April 1595), priest and poet
- Nicholas Owen (c. 1562 – 1/2 March 1606), laybrother who built priest holes in the reign of Queen Elizabeth I and King James I
- Thomas Garnet (9 November 1575 – 23 June 1608), priest
- Edmund Arrowsmith (c. 1585 – 28 August 1628), priest
- Henry Morse (c. 1595 – 1 February 1645), priest who ministered during the plague of 1624
- Philip Evans (c. 1645 – 22 July 1679), Welsh priest martyred as one of the victims of the Oates/Popish Plot scare
- David Lewis (c. 1616 – 27 August 1679), Welsh priest martyred as one of the victims of the Oates/Popish Plot scare

=== Martyrs of the Canadian Missions, canonized on 29 June 1930 ===
- Rene Goupil (15 May 1608 – 29 September 1642), laybrother
- Isaac Jogues (10 January 1607 – 18 October 1646), priest
- Jean de Lalande (died 18 October 1646), laybrother
- Antoine Daniel (27 May 1601 – 4 July 1648), priest
- Jean de Brébeuf (25 March 1593 – 16 March 1649), priest
- Gabriel Lalemant (3 October 1610 – 17 March 1649), priest
- Charles Garnier (25 May 1606 – 7 December 1649), priest
- Noël Chabanel (2 February 1613 – 8 December 1649), priest

=== Martyrs of the Paraguayan Missions, canonized on 16 May 1988 ===
- Roque González de Santa Cruz (17 November 1576 – 15 November 1628), Guarani-born missionary
- Alfonso Rodríguez Olmedo (10 March 1598 – 15 November 1628), missionary priest
- Juan de Castillo (14 September 1595 – 17 November 1628), missionary priest

=== Martyrs of Kosice, canonized on 2 July 1995 as part of the Martyrs of the Reformation in Europe ===
- Melchior Grodziecki (c. 1582 – 7 September 1619), Polish-born priest
- István Pongrácz (c. 1584 – 7 September 1619), Hungarian-born priest

=== Martyrs of Japan (Nagasaki), canonized on 8 June 1862 as part of the Twenty-six Martyrs of Japan ===
- Ioannes Soan de Goto (c. 1578 – 7 February 1597), cleric
- Didacus Kisai (c. 1533 – 7 February 1597), professed religious
- Paulus Miki (c. 1564 – 7 February 1597), Jesuit brother

=== Martyrs of the Boxer Rebellion, canonized on 1 October 2000 as part of the 120 Martyrs of China ===
- Modeste Andlauer (22 May 1847 – 19 June 1900), priest
- Rémy Isoré (22 January 1852 – 19 June 1900), priest
- Lèon-Ignance Mangin (30 July 1857 – 20 July 1900), priest
- Paul Denn (1 April 1847 – 20 July 1900), priest

=== Other martyred members ===
- John Ogilvie (c. 1580 – 10 March 1615), the only Roman Catholic martyr during the Reformation in Scotland, canonized on 17 October 1976
- André de Soveral (c. 1572 – 16 July 1645), Brazilian-born priest martyred by Calvinists in Cunhau, canonized on 15 October 2017
- Andrzej Bobola (c. 1591 – 16 May 1657), Polish missionary martyred during the Khmelnytsky Uprising, canonized on 17 April 1938
- Joao de Brito (1 March 1647 – 4 February 1693), Portuguese missionary martyred in India, canonized on 22 June 1947
- Jacques Berthieu (27 November 1838 – 8 June 1896), French missionary martyred in Madagascar, canonized on 21 October 2012

== Blesseds ==
=== Confessors ===
- Julien Maunoir (1 October 1606 – 28 January 1683), Apostle of Brittany, beatified on 20 May 1951
- Johann Philipp Jeningen (5 January 1642 – 8 February 1704), Geman priest, beatified on 16 July 2022
- Antonio Baldinucci (19 June 1665 – 7 November 1717), missionary, beatified on 16 April 1893
- Bernardo Francisco de Hoyos de Seña (21 August 1711 – 29 November 1735), Spanish priest best known for his ardent devotion to the Sacred Heart, beatified on 18 April 2010
- Jan Beyzym (15 May 1850 – 2 October 1912), Polish priest and missionary to Madagascar, beatified on 18 August 2002
- Tiburcio Arnaiz Muñoz (11 August 1865 – 18 July 1926), Spanish priest and founder of the Missionaries of the Rural Parishes, beatified on 20 October 2018
- Francisco Gárate Aranguren (3 February 1857 – 9 September 1929), professed religious, beatified on 6 October 1985
- John Sullivan (8 May 1861 – 19 February 1933), Irish priest, beatified on 13 May 2017
- Rupert Mayer (23 January 1876 – 1 November 1945) German priest and a leading figure of the Catholic resistance to Nazism in Munich, beatified on 3 May 1987

=== Martyrs of Brazil, beatified on 11 May 1854 as victims of the Reformation ===
- Inácio de Azevedo (c. 1526 – 15 July 1570), priest
- Diogo de Andrade (c. 1531 – 15 July 1570), priest
- Francisco Alvares (c. 1539 – 15 July 1570), professed religious
- Gaspar Alvares (died 15 July 1570), professed religious
- Manuel Alvares (c. 1536 – 15 July 1570), professed religious
- Alonso de Baena (c. 1539 – 15 July 1570), professed religious
- Marcos Caldeira (c. 1547 – 15 July 1570), novice religious
- Bento de Castro (c. 1543 – 15 July 1570), professed cleric
- António Correia (c. 1553 – 15 July 1570), novice cleric
- Luís Correia (died 15 July 1570), novice cleric
- Aleixo Delgado (died 15 July 1570), novice cleric
- Nicolau Dinis (c. 1553 – 15 July 1570), novice cleric
- Gregorio Escribano (died 15 July 1570), professed religious
- Antônio Fernandes (c. 1552 – 15 July 1570), novice religious
- Domingos Fernandes (c. 1551 – 15 July 1570), professed religious
- João Fernandes (I) (c. 1547 – 15 July 1570), professed cleric
- João Fernandes (II) (c. 1551 – 15 July 1570), professed cleric
- Manuel Fernandes (died 15 July 1570), professed cleric
- Pedro de Fontoura (died 15 July 1570), professed cleric
- André Gonçalve (died 15 July 1570), professed cleric
- Gonçalo Henriques (died 15 July 1570), professed cleric
- Simão Lopes (died 15 July 1570), professed cleric
- Francisco de Magalhães (c. 1549 – 15 July 1570), novice cleric
- Juan de Mayorga (c. 1533 – 15 July 1570), professed religious
- Álvaro Borralho Mendes (died 15 July 1570), professed cleric
- Pedro Nunes (died 15 July 1570), professed cleric
- Manuel Pacheco (died 15 July 1570), professed cleric
- Francisco Pérez Godoy (c. 1540 – 15 July 1570), novice cleric
- Diogo Pires Mimoso (died 15 July 1570), professed cleric
- Brás Ribeiro (c. 1546 – 15 July 1570), novice religious
- Luís Rodrigues (c. 1554 – 15 July 1570), novice
- Manuel Rodrigues (died 15 July 1570), professed cleric
- Fernando Sánchez (died 15 July 1570), professed cleric
- Juan de San Martín (died 15 July 1570), novice cleric
- António Soares (died 15 July 1570), professed cleric
- Amaro Vaz (c. 1554 – 15 July 1570), novice religious
- Juan de Zafra (died 15 July 1570), professed religious
- Esteban Zuraire (died 15 July 1570), professed religious
- Jõao “Adauctus” (died 15 July 1570), candidate
- Simão da Costa (died 16 July 1570), novice religious

=== Martyrs of Aubenas, beatified on 6 June 1926 ===
- Jacques Salès (21 March 1556 – 7 February 1593), priest
- Guillaume Saultemouche (c. 1557 – 7 February 1593), priest

=== Martyrs of Cuncolim, beatified on 30 April 1893 ===
- Rodolfo Acquaviva (2 October 1550 – 25 July 1583), Italian priest
- Pietro Berno (c. 1552 – 25 July 1583), Swiss priest
- Antonio Francisco (c. 1550 – 25 July 1583), Portuguese priest
- Francisco Aranha (c. 1551 – 25 July 1583), Portuguese professed religious
- Alonso Pacheco Alcaron (c. 1551 – 25 July 1583), Spanish professed religious

=== Martyrs of the English Reformation, beatified on 29 December 1886 ===
(note: this cause also includes two Jesuits who were subsequently canonized in 1970)

- Thomas Woodhouse (c. 1535 – 19 June 1573), priest
- John Nelson (c. 1535 – 3 February 1578), priest
- Thomas Cottam (c. 1549 – 30 May 1582), priest

=== Martyrs of the English Reformation, beatified on 15 December 1929 as part of the One Hundred and Seven Martyrs of England and Wales ===
(note: this cause also includes eight Jesuits who were subsequently canonized in 1970)

- John Cornelius (Mohun) (c. 1557 – 4 July 1594), priest
- Francis Page (died 20 April 1602), Belgian-born priest
- Edward Oldcorne (Hall) (1561 – 7 April 1606), priest martyred as one of the victims of the Gunpowder Plot scare
- Ralph Ashley (died 7 April 1606), professed religious martyred as one of the victims of the Gunpowder Plot scare
- Thomas Holland (c. 1600 – 12 December 1642), priest
- Ralph Corby (Corbie or Corbington) (25 March 1598 – 7 September 1644), priest
- Peter Wright (c. 1603 – 19 May 1651), priest
- William Ireland (Iremonger) (c. 1636 – 24 January 1679), priest martyred as one of the victims of the Oates/Popish Plot scare
- Thomas Whitbread (Harcourt) (c. 1618 – 20 June 1679), priest martyred as one of the victims of the Oates/Popish Plot scare
- William Harcourt (Barrow) (c. 1610 – 20 June 1679), priest martyred as one of the victims of the Oates/Popish Plot scare
- John Fenwick (Caldwell) (c. 1628 – 20 June 1679), priest martyred as one of the victims of the Oates/Popish Plot scare
- John Gavan (c. 1640 – 20 June 1679), priest martyred as one of the victims of the Oates/Popish Plot scare
- Anthony Turner (c. 1628 – 20 June 1679), priest martyred as one of the victims of the Oates/Popish Plot scare

=== Martyrs of the English Reformation, beatified on 22 November 1987 as part of the Eighty-five Martyrs of England and Wales ===
- Roger Filcock (Arthur Naylor) (c. 1572 – 27 February 1601), priest
- Robert Middleton (c. 1571 – 31 March 1601), priest

=== Martyrs of Japan, beatified on 7 May 1867 ===
- João Baptista Machado de Távora (c. 1580 – 22 May 1617), Portuguese priest
- Leonardus Kimura (c. 1575 – 18 November 1619), professed religious
- Ambrosio Fernandes (c. August 1551 – 7 January 1620), Portuguese professed religious
- Augustinus Ōta (c. 1572 – 10 August 1622), professed religious
- Sebastianus Kimura (c. 1565 – 10 September 1622), priest
- Carlo Spinola (c. 1564 or 1565 – 10 September 1622), Italian priest
- Gundisalvus Fusai (c. 1580 – 10 September 1622), professed cleric
- Antonius Kiuni (c. 1572 – 10 September 1622), professed cleric
- Thomas Akahoshi (c. 1565 – 10 September 1622), professed cleric
- Petrus Sanpō (c. 1580 – 10 September 1622), professed cleric
- Michaël Shunpō (c. 1589 – 10 September 1622), professed cleric
- Ludovicus Kawara (c. 1583 – 10 September 1622), professed cleric
- Ioannes Chūgoku (c. 1573 – 10 September 1622), professed cleric
- Giovanni Battista (Camillo) Costanzo (c. November 1571 – 15 September 1622), Italian priest
- Pietro Paolo Navarro (25 December 1560 – 1 November 1622), Italian priest
- Dionisius Fujishima (c. 1584 – 1 November 1622), professed cleric
- Petrus Onizuka Sadayū (c. 1604 – 1 November 1622), professed cleric
- Girolamo de Angelis (c. 1568 – 4 December 1623), Italian priest
- Simon Enpo (c. 1580 – 4 December 1623), professed religious
- Diogo de Carvalho (c. 1578 – 22 February 1624), Portuguese priest
- Miguel de Carvalho (c. 1579 – 25 August 1624), Portuguese priest
- Francisco Pacheco (c. 1566 – 20 June 1626), Portuguese priest
- Baltasar de Torres Arias (14 December 1563 – 20 June 1626), Spanish priest
- Giovanni Battista Zola (1 November 1575 – 20 June 1626), Italian priest
- Petrus Rinsei (c. 1588 – 20 June 1626), professed cleric
- Vincentius Kaun (c. 1579 – 20 June 1626), professed cleric
- Ioannes Kisaku (c. 1605 – 20 June 1626), professed cleric
- Paulus Shinsuke (c. 1581 – 20 June 1626), professed cleric
- Michaël Tōzō (c. 1588 – 20 June 1626), professed cleric
- Gaspar Sadamatsu (c. 1565 – 20 June 1626), professed cleric
- Thomas Tsūji (c. 1570 – 7 September 1627), priest
- Michaël Nakajima (c. 1583 – 25 December 1628), professed religious
- Antonius Pinto Ishida (c. 1570 – 3 September 1632), priest

=== Martyrs of Japan, beatified on 24 November 2008 ===
- Didacus Yūki Ryōsetsu (c. 1574–75 – 25 February 1636), priest
- Petrus Kibe Kasui (c. 1587 – 4 July 1639), priest

=== Martyrs of the September Massacres, beatified on 17 October 1926 as part of the Martyrs of the French Revolution ===
- Anne-Alexandre-Charles-Marie Lanfant (9 September 1726 – 2 September 1792), priest
- François Balmain (23 May 1733 – 2 September 1792), priest
- Charles-Jéremie Bérauld du Pérou (17 November 1737 – 2 September 1792), priest
- Jacques-Jules Bonnaud (27 October 1740 – 2 September 1792), priest
- Claude Cayx-Dumas (6 November 1724 – 2 September 1792), priest
- Jean Charton De Millou (7 September 1751 – 2 September 1792), priest
- Guillaume-Antoine Delfaut (5 April 1733 – 2 September 1792), priest
- Jacques Friteyre-Durvé (18 April 1725 – 2 September 1792), priest
- Claude-François Gagnières des Granges (23 May 1722 – 2 September 1792), priest
- Claude-Antoine-Raoul Laporte (6 December 1734 – 2 September 1792), priest
- Mathurin-Nicolas de la Villecrohain Le Bous De Villeneuve (19 December 1731 – 2 September 1792), priest
- Charles-François le Gué (6 October 1724 – 2 September 1792), priest
- Vincent-Joseph le Rousseau de Rosencoat (3 July 1726 – 2 September 1792), priest
- Loup Thomas-Bonnotte (19 October 1719 – 2 September 1792), priest
- François Varheilhe-Duteil (15 June 1734 – 2 September 1792), priest
- Michel-François de Lagardette (5 September 1744 – 3 September 1792), priest
- François-Hyacinthe Lé Livec de Trésurin (5 May 1726 – 3 September 1792), priest
- René-Marie Andrieux (16 February 1742 – 3 September 1792), priest
- Jean-François-Marie Benoît-Vourlat (26 March 1731 – 3 September 1792), priest
- Pierre-Michel Guérin du Rocher (c. 1731 – 3 September 1792), priest
- Robert-François Guérin du Rocher (23 October 1736 – 3 September 1792), priest
- Éloy Herque du Roule (31 May 1741 – 3 September 1792), priest
- Jean-Antoine Seconds (c. 1734 – 3 September 1792), priest
- Nicolas-Marie Verron (7 November 1754 – 3 September 1792), priest

=== Martyrs of Rochefort, beatified on 1 October 1995 as part of the Martyrs of the French Revolution ===
- Joseph Imbert (between 1719 and 1721 – 9 June 1794), priest
- Jean-Nicolas Cordier (3 December 1710 – 30 September 1794), priest

=== Martyrs of Valencia, beatified on 11 March 2001 as part of the 233 Martyrs of the Spanish Civil War ===
- Tomàs Sitjar Fortiá (21 March 1866 – 19 August 1936), priest
- Constantino Carbonell Sempere (12 April 1866 – 23 August 1936), priest
- Ramón Grimaltos Monllor (3 March 1861 – 23 August 1936), professed religious
- Pere Gelabert Amer (29 March 1887 – 23 August 1936), professed religious
- Josep Tarrats Comaposada (29 August 1878 – 28 September 1936), professed religious
- Pau Bori Puig (12 November 1864 – 29 September 1936), priest
- Dario Hernández Morató (25 October 1880 – 29 September 1936), priest
- Vicente Sales Genovés (15 October 1881 – 29 September 1936), professed religious
- Narcis Basté Basté (16 December 1866 – 15 October 1936), priest
- Alfredo Simón Colomina (8 March 1877 – 29 November 1936), priest
- Juan Bautista Ferreres Boluda (28 November 1861 – 29 December 1936), priest

=== Martyrs of Albania, beatified on 5 November 2016 ===
- Daniel Dajani (2 December 1906 – 4 March 1946), Albanian priest
- Giovanni Fausti (19 October 1899 – 4 March 1946), Italian priest
- Gjon Pantalla (2 June 1887 – 31 October 1947), Albanian professed religious

=== Other martyred members ===
- Dominic Collins (c. 1566 – 31 October 1602), Irish Jesuit brother and ex-soldier martyred during the Reformation in Ireland, beatified on 27 September 1992
- Diego Luis de San Vitores (12 November 1627 – 2 April 1672), Spanish missionary martyred in Guam, beatified on 6 October 1985
- Giovanni Antonio Solinas (15 February 1643 – 27 October 1683), Italian missionary martyred in Zenta, Argentina, beatified on 2 July 2022
- Victor Emilio Moscoso y Cárdenas (21 April 1846 – 4 May 1897), Ecuadorian priest martyred during the Liberal Revolution, beatified on 16 November 2019
- Miguel Agustín Pro (13 January 1891 – 23 November 1927), Mexican priest martyred during the Cristero War, beatified on 25 September 1988
- Eduard Gottlieb Profittlich (11 September 1890 – 22 February 1942), Apostolic Administrator of Estonia martyred during Soviet rule, beatified on 6 September 2025
- Victor Dillard (24 December 1897 – 12 January 1945), French priest martyred by Nazis during World War II, beatified on 13 December 2025
- Rutilio Grande García (5 July 1928 – 12 March 1977), Salvadoran priest martyred before the Salvadoran Civil War, beatified on 22 January 2022

== Venerables ==
- Alonzo de Barcena (c. 1530 – 31 December 1597), Spanish priest, missionary, and linguist, declared Venerable on 18 December 2017
- Matteo Ricci (6 October 1552 – 11 May 1610), one of the founding figures of the Jesuit China missions, declared Venerable on 17 December 2022
- Luis de la Puente (11 November 1554 – 16 February 1624), theologian and ascetic writer, declared Venerable on 16 July 1759
- Luigi la Nuza (c. July 1591 – 21 October 1656), "Apostle of Sicily", declared Venerable on 25 March 1847
- Eusebio Francisco Kino (10 August 1645 – 15 March 1711), Italian missionary to Mexico, declared Venerable on 10 July 2020
- Petar Barbaric (19 May 1874 – 15 April 1897), Bosnian novice, declared Venerable on 18 March 2015
- Francisco de Paula Tarin Arnau (7 October 1847 – 12 December 1910), Spanish priest, declared Venerable on 3 January 1987
- Adolf Petit (22 May 1822 – 20 May 1914), Belgian priest, declared Venerable on 15 December 1966
- Wilhelm Eberschweiler (5 December 1837 – 23 December 1921), German priest, declared Venerable on 19 May 2018
- Antonio Repiso Martínez de Orbe (8 February 1856 – 27 July 1929), Spanish priest and founder of the Sisters of the Divine Shepherd, declared Venerable on 27 February 2017
- Jacint Alegre Pujals (24 December 1874 – 10 December 1930), Spanish priest, declared Venerable on 9 May 2014
- Kaszap Istvan (25 March 1916 – 17 December 1935), Hungarian seminarian, declared Venerable on 16 December 2006
- José Marcos Figueróa Umpierrez (7 October 1865 – 19 November 1942), Spanish priest, declared Venerable on 17 December 2022
- Giuseppe Picco (4 July 1867 – 31 August 1946), Italian priest, declared Venerable on 18 December 1997

== Servants of God ==
=== Confessors ===
- Francesco Gaetano (11 November 1569 – 20 April 1601), professed cleric
- Bernardo Colnago (16 September 1545 – 22 April 1611), priest
- Piotr Skarga (2 February 1536 – 27 September 1612), Polish priest and writer, declared as a Servant of God on 10 October 2014
- Joao Cardim (2 June 1585 – 18 February 1615), Portuguese priest
- Jakob Rem (c. June 1546 – 12 October 1618), Austrian priest
- Juan Sebastián de la Parra Arguas (c. 1546 – 21 May 1622), Spanish priest
- Diego Martín Serrano García (2 July 1542 – 12 April 1626), Spanish priest
- Bernardo de Antequera (c. 1572 – 18 September 1634), Spanish priest, declared as a Servant of God on 16 June 2016
- Giorgio Giustiniani (23 April 1569 – 3 December 1644), Italian priest
- Vincenzo Carafa (5 May 1585 – 6 June 1649), Seventh Superior-General of the Society of Jesus
- Martin Streda (11 November 1587 – 26 August 1649), Polish priest, declared as a Servant of God on 4 November 2021
- Etienne Faber (14 February 1597 – 10 May 1657), French priest and missionary to China
- Juan de Alloza Menacho (26 May 1597 – 6 November 1666), Peruvian priest
- Francisco del Castillo (9 February 1615 – 12 April 1673), Peruvian priest
- Manuel Pardial Ruiz (15 April 1661 – 28 April 1725), Spanish priest
- Francesco Maria Galluzzi (c. June 1696 – 7 September 1731), priest
- Pierre-Jean Caron (13 January 1672 – 31 January 1754), French priest
- Juan Pedro Mayoral Ramos de Manzano (16 October 1678 – 9 December 1754), Spanish priest
- Michele Ansaldo (29 September 1739 – 2 November 1805), Italian priest and founder of the Franciscan Sisters of Saint Aloysius Gonzaga, declared as a Servant of God on 3 December 2020
- Pierre-Joseph Picot de Clorivière (9 June 1735 – 9 January 1820), French priest and founder of both the Society of the Daughters of the Heart of Mary and Secular Institute of the Priests of the Heart of Jesus
- Agostino (Luigi Maria) Solari (13 May 1795 – 27 August 1829), Italian priest
- Jan Philip Roothan (23 November 1785 – 8 May 1853), Dutch priest
- Paolo Capelloni (21 February 1776 – 14 October 1857), Italian priest
- Jean-François-Régis Barthès (31 August 1790 – 26 January 1861), French priest and founder of the Religious of Our Lady of Compassion, declared as a Servant of God on 5 February 2001
- Constant Lievens (10 April 1856 – 6 May 1893), Belgian priest, declared as a Servant of God in 2008
- Paul Ginhac (31 May 1824 – 10 January 1895), French priest
- Louis-Etienne Rabussier (12 December 1831 – 9 December 1897), French priest and founder of the Sisters of the Holy Family of the Sacred Heart
- Francesc Xavier Butinyà Hospital (16 April 1834 – 18 December 1899), Spanish priest and founder of the Religious Daughters of Saint Joseph and Servants of Saint Joseph, declared as a Servant of God on 15 November 2006
- Nicolás Rodríguez Campo (5 December 1830 – 30 September 1900), Spanish priest
- Riccardo Friedl (16 September 1847 – 27 February 1917), Croatian-Italian priest
- William Doyle (3 March 1873 – 16 August 1917), Irish priest, declared as a Servant of God on 1 September 2022
- Wojciech Maria Baudiss (14 April 1842 – 25 April 1926), Polish priest, declared as a Servant of God on 8 February 1993
- Saturnino Ibarguren Guridi (11 February 1856 – 9 February 1927), Spanish priest
- Salvador Garcidueñas Argüello (5 August 1856 – 4 October 1927), Spanish priest
- Ignacio María Arámburu Alústiza (31 January 1852 – 5 January 1935), Spanish priest
- Fernando de Huidobro Polanco (10 March 1903 – 11 April 1937), Spanish priest
- Francisco Rodriguez da Cruz (29 July 1859 – 1 October 1948), Portuguese priest

=== Martyrs of the La Florida Missions ===
Soure:

- Pedro Martínez (15 October 1533 – 6 October 1566), priest
- Luis de Quirós (died between 4 and 5 February 1571), priest
- Gabriel de Solís (died between 4 and 5 February 1571), novice
- Juan Bautista Méndez (died between 4 and 5 February 1571), novice
- Juan Bautista de Segura (c. 1529 – between 9 and 10 February 1571), priest
- Pedro de Linares (died between 9 and 10 February 1571), professed religious
- Sancho Ceballos (died between 9 and 10 February 1571), professed religious
- Gabriel Gómez (died between 9 and 10 February 1571), professed religious
- Cristóbal Redondo (died between 9 and 10 February 1571), novice

=== Martyrs of Brazil ===
- Pedro Días (I) (c. 1517 – 13 September 1571), priest
- Francisco de Castro (c. 1535 – 13 September 1571), priest
- Francisco Paulo (died 13 September 1571), professed religious
- Miguel Aragonés (c. 1543 – 13 September 1571), professed cleric
- Gaspar de Goís (c. 1546 – 13 September 1571), professed cleric
- Afonso Fernandes (c. 1548 – 14 September 1571), professed cleric
- Pedro Fernandes (c. 1542 – 14 September 1571), professed religious
- Ferñao de Álvares (c. 1542 – 14 September 1571), professed religious
- Diogo de Carvalho (died 14 September 1571), professed religious
- André Paes (c. 1549 – 14 September 1571), professed cleric
- João Álvares (c. 1548 – 14 September 1571), professed cleric
- Pedro Días (II) (c. 1541 – 14 September 1571), professed cleric

=== Martyrs of Ireland ===
- Edmund Daniel (died 25 October 1572), cleric
- William Boyton (died 13 September 1647), priest
- John Bathe (died 11 September 1649), priest

=== Martyrs of Araucania (Chile) ===
- Orazio [Horacio] de Vecchi Ghigi (24 October 1577 – 14 December 1612), Italian priest
- Martín de Aranda Valdivia (c. 1556 – 14 December 1612), Chilean priest
- Diego de Montalbán (died 14 December 1612), Mexican novice

=== Martyrs of Durango (Mexico), declared as Servants of God on 20 February 2013 ===
- Hernando de Tobar (c. 1581 – 16 November 1616), priest
- Bernardo de Cisneros (c. 1582 – 18 November 1616), priest
- Diego de Orozco (c. 1588 – 18 November 1616), priest
- Juan del Valle (22 October 1575 – 18 November 1616), priest
- Luis de Alavés (29 January 1589 – 18 November 1616), priest
- Juan Fonte (20 August 1574 – 19 November 1616), priest
- Jerónimo de Moranta (c. 1574 – 19 November 1616), priest
- Hernando de Santarén (c. February 1567 – 20 November 1616), priest

=== Martyrs of Ethiopia ===
Soure:

- Andrés de Oviedo (c. 1518 – 29 June 1577), Spanish priest and Patriarch of Ethiopia
- François Abraham de Georgiis (c. 1563 – 30 April 1595), Syrian priest
- Gaspar Paes (c. 1593 – 25 April 1635), Portuguese priest
- João Pereira (c. 1601 – 2 May 1635), Portuguese priest
- Apolinar de Almeida (22 July 1587 – 14 June 1638), Portuguese priest, Titular Archbishop of Nicaea and Coadjutor Patriarch of Ethiopia
- Giacinto Franceschi (c. 1598 – 14 June 1638), Italian priest
- Francisco Rodrigues (c. 1603 – 14 June 1638), Portuguese priest
- Luis Cardeira (c. 1585 – 12 April 1640), Portuguese priest
- Bruno Bruni (15 January or 7 November 1590 – 12 April 1640), Italian priest

=== Martyrs of Japan ===
- Francisco Carrión (c. 1552 – 23 July 1590), Spanish priest
- Theodoor Mantels (c. 1560 – 5 May 1593), Belgian priest
- Giuseppe Fornaletto (c. 1546 – c. 1593), Italian priest
- Ruiz Castro (c. 1551 – c. 1611), Portuguese priest
- Diogo de Mesquita (c. 1533 – 4 November 1614), Portuguese priest
- Paulus [Soterus] Kudō (c. 1562 – 22 November 1614), Japanese professed religious
- Antonio Francisco de Critana (c. 1548 – c. December 1614), Spanish priest
- Manuel Barreto (c. 1563 – 30 September 1620), Portuguese priest
- Juan Bautista de Baeza (c. 1558 – 7 May 1626), Spanish priest
- Gaspar de Crasto (c. 1560 – 7 May 1626), Portuguese priest
- Michael Kimura Michio Shukkan (c. 1565 – end of October 1628), Japanese professed religious
- Thomas Nishihori (c. 1584 – 22 July 1633), Japanese cleric
- Manuel Borges (c. 1584 – 16 August 1633), Portuguese priest
- Iosephus Ryōmi (died 16 August 1633), Japanese professed religious
- Ignatius Kidō (died 17 August 1633), Japanese professed religious
- Giacomo Antonio Giannone (7 September 1577 – 28 August 1633), Italian professed religious
- Ioannes Kidera Kuhyōe (died 29 August 1633), Japanese cleric
- Thomas Ryōkan (died 30 September 1633), Japanese professed religious
- Ludovicus Kafuku (died 30 September 1633), Japanese professed religious
- Dionysius Yamamoto Fuen (died 30 September 1633), Japanese professed religious
- Iacobus Takashima Rokubyōe (died 30 September 1633), Japanese cleric
- Ioannes Yama (c. 1566 – c. 30 September 1633), Japanese professed religious
- Bento Fernandes (c. 1579 – 2 October 1633), Portuguese priest
- Paulus Saitō Shōzaemon (c. 1576 – 2 October 1633), Japanese priest
- João da Costa (c. 1574 – 9 October 1633), Portuguese priest
- Sixtus Iyo Tokuun (c. 1570 – 10 October 1633), Japanese priest
- Damianus Fukaye (died 11 October 1633), Japanese professed religious
- Petrus... (died 21 October 1633), Japanese professed religious
- Matthaeus... (died 21 October 1633), Japanese professed religious
- Giovanni Matteo Adami (17 May 1576 – 22 October 1633), Italian priest, declared as a Servant of God in 2019
- António de Sousa (c. 1588 – 26 October 1633), Portuguese priest
- Mateus de Couros (c. 1568 – 29 October 1633), Portuguese priest
- Francesco Boldrini [Buldrini] (c. November 1575 – 8 December 1633), Italian priest
- Marcello Francesco Mastrilli (14 September 1603 – 17 October 1637), Italian priest
- Martinus Shikimi (c. 1577 – between September-October 1641), Japanese priest
- Antonio Rubino (1 March 1578 – 22 March 1643), Italian priest
- Wojciech Męciński (c. 1598 – 23 March 1643), Polish priest
- Diego de Morales Contreras (13 September 1604 – 25 March 1643), Spanish priest
- Antonio Capece (11 August 1606 – 25 March 1643), Italian priest
- Franciscus Marques-Ogi (c. 1611 – 25 March 1643), Japanese priest
- Mancius Konishi (c. 1600 – c. 1644), Japanese priest
- Giovanni Battista Sidoti (22 August 1667 – 27 November 1714), Apostolic Vicar of Japan

=== Martyrs of Hanoi (Vietnam) ===
- Giovanni Battista Messari (12 August 1673 – 15 June 1723), Italian priest
- Francesco Maria Bucherelli (21 May 1686 – 11 October 1723), Italian priest
- Bartolomeu Alvares (10 August 1706 – 12 January 1737), Portuguese priest
- Manuel de Abreu (14 October 1708 – 12 January 1737), Portuguese priest
- Vicente da Cunha (2 February 1708 – 12 January 1737), Portuguese priest
- Johann Kaspar Kratz (14 September 1698 – 12 January 1737), German priest

=== Martyrs of Jiangsu (China) ===
- Antônio José Henriques (13 June 1707 – 14 September 1748), Portuguese priest
- Tristano Francesco D’Attimis (28 July 1707 – 14 September 1748), Italian priest

=== Martyrs of the French Revolution from the Archdiocese of Lyon, declared as Servants of God on 20 June 2023 ===
- Charles-Dominique Ferry (c. 1709 - 11 February 1794), Monacan priest
- Gabriel-Daniel Dupliex (c.1726 - 17 February 1794), priest

=== Martyrs of Zahle (Lebanon) ===
- Edouard Billotet (23 May 1812 – 18 June 1860), French priest
- Ferdinando Bonacina (7 April 1804 – 18 June 1860), Italian professed religious
- Elyās Yūnes (c. 1830 – 18 June 1860), Lebanese professed religious
- Habīb Maksūd (27 September 1810 – 18 June 1860), Lebanese professed religious
- Ālfūns Haydar Hubaysh (31 May 1815 – 18 June 1860), Lebanese professed religious

=== Martyrs of the Paris Commune ===
- Alexis Clerc (11 December 1819 – 24 May 1871), priest
- Léon Ducoudray (6 May 1827 – 24 May 1871), priest
- Pierre Olivaint (22 February 1816 – 26 May 1871), priest
- Jean Caubert (20 July 1811 – 26 May 1871), priest
- Anatole de Bengy (19 September 1824 – 26 May 1871), priest

=== Martyrs of the Spanish Civil War ===
- Emilio Martínez Martínez (28 May 1893 – 7 October 1934), priest
- Juan Bautista Arconada Pérez (15 February 1890 – 7 October 1934), professed religious
- Ramon Artigues Sirvent (29 December 1902 – 20 July 1936), postulant
- Fèlix Cots Olivera (1 February 1895 – 21 July 1936), priest
- José Roma Carrés (1 December 1885 – 21 July 1936), priest
- Felipe Iriondo Amundaráin (26 May 1869 – 21 July 1936), professed religious
- Braulio Martínez Simón (26 March 1852 – 25 July 1936), priest
- Lorenzo Isla Sanz (10 August 1865 – 25 July 1936), priest
- Manuel Peypoch Sala (2 December 1870 – 29 July 1936), priest
- Ignacio Elduayen Larrañaga (9 March 1884 – 7 August 1936), professed religious
- Pascual Ruiz Ramírez (14 June 1901 – 7 August 1936), professed religious
- Jesús Ballesta Tejero (1 January 1903 – 8 August 1936), priest
- Joaquim Maria Valentí de Martí (17 October 1884 – 14 August 1936), priest
- Lluís Bogunyà Porta (14 April 1893 – 14 August 1936), priest
- Josep Antoni Vergés de Trías (10 January 1898 – 14 August 1936), priest
- Andreu Carrió Bertran (30 November 1876 – 26 August 1936), priest
- Francisco Javier Tena Colom (9 March 1863 – 26 August 1936), priest
- Martín Santaella Gutiérrez (3 February 1873 – 26 August 1936), priest
- Josep Sampol Escalas (11 September 1899 – 27 August 1936), professed religious
- Manuel Luque Fontanilla (28 December 1856 – 31 August 1936), priest
- Alfonso Payán Pérez (20 February 1877 – 31 August 1936), priest
- Miquel Mendoza Reig (21 June 1889 – 1 September 1936), priest
- Josep Llatje Blanch (17 August 1893 – 5 September 1936), professed religious
- Manuel González Hernández (17 October 1889 – 8 September 1936), priest
- Domingo Ibarlucea Oregui (6 October 1906 – 8 September 1936), professed religious
- Ricardo Tena Montero De Espinosa (28 December 1877 – 8 September 1936), priest
- José Sánchez Oliva (10 November 1891 – 9 September 1936), priest
- Antonio Sanchiz Martínez (13 December 1906 – 9 September 1936), professed religious
- Ignacio De Velasco Nieto (19 July 1890 – 23 September 1936), priest
- Manuel [Juan] Gómez Hellín (15 September 1899 – 2 October 1936), priest
- Josep Muñoz Albiol (12 November 1904 – 15 October 1936), priest
- Marcial Mayorga Paredes (7 July 1902 – 15 October 1936), priest
- Demetrio Zurbitu Recalde (22 December 1886 – 29 October 1936), priest
- Francesc Audí Cid (8 February 1872 – 3 November 1936), priest
- Joan Rovira Orlandis (4 October 1877 – 3 November 1936), priest
- José María Alegre Jiménez (1 November 1865 – 10 November 1936), priest
- Bartomeu Arbona Estades (20 December 1862 – 29 November 1936), priest
- Manuel María de la Cerda de las Bárcenas (5 December 1900 – 4 December 1936), priest
- Olegario Corral García (17 September 1871 – 28 December 1936), priest
- Jaume Noguera Baró (14 September 1901 – 14 February 1937), priest
- Constantí March Battles (10 March 1877 – 26 March 1937), professed religious

=== Martyrs of World War II, declared as Servants of God on 18 February 2003 ===
- Józef Cyrek (13 September 1904 – 2 September 1940), priest
- Marian Józef Wojciech Morawski (10 October 1881 – 8 September 1940), priest
- Franciszek Mateusz Kałuża (18 September 1877 – 19 January 1941), priest
- Bronisław Wielgosz (22 September 1916 – 29 April 1942), cleric
- Stanisław Felczak (27 January 1906 – 9 May 1942), priest
- Stanisław Komar (30 March 1882 – 15 July 1942), professed religious
- Stanisław Józef Bednarski (9 April 1896 – 16 July 1942), priest
- Kazimierz Marian Antoni Dembowski (3 August 1912 – 10 August 1942), priest
- Michał Malinowski (29 November 1887 – 13 September 1942), priest
- Adam Sztark (30 July 1907 – 19 December 1942), priest
- Stanisław Sewiłło (25 October 1917 – 22 March 1943), cleric
- Czesław Sejbuk (4 October 1906 – 20 April 1943), priest
- Edmund Roszak (5 October 1900 – 14 July 1943), priest
- Władysław Wiącek (19 September 1910 – 2 August 1944), priest
- Stanisław Tadeusz Podoleński (2 December 1887 – 13 January 1945), priest
- Jan Zając (11 December 1911 – 12 February 1945), professed religious
- Jerzy Stanisław Musial (3 August 1919 – 9 March 1945), cleric

=== Martyrs of El Salvador ===
- Ignacio Ellacuría Beascoechea (9 November 1930 – 18 November 1989), priest
- Ignacio Martín Baró (7 November 1942 – 18 November 1989), priest
- Segundo Montes Mozo (15 May 1933 – 18 November 1989), priest
- Juan Ramón Moreno Pardo (29 August 1933 – 18 November 1989), priest
- Amando López Quintana (6 February 1936 – 18 November 1989), priest
- Joaquín López López (16 August 1918 – 18 November 1989), priest

=== Other martyred members ===
- Antonio Pietro Criminali (7 February 1520 – 26 May 1549), priest martyred in India
- Goncalo de Silviera (23 February 1526 – 16 March 1561), priest martyred in Zimbabwe
- Gil de Abreu (c. 1593 - c. March 1624), Portuguese priest and missionary martyred in Indonesia
- Francesco Palliola (10 May 1612 – 29 January 1648), Italian priest and missionary martyred in the Philippines, declared as a Servant of God in July 2016
- Tomas Esteban Etayo (23 September 1879 – between December 1933 and June 1934), Spanish priest martyred in China
- Tomáš Dezider Munk (29 January 1924 – 21 or 22 April 1945), Hungarian novice martyred in Germany during World War II, declared as a Servant of God on 5 May 2011

== See also ==
- List of Jesuits
- List of Catholic martyrs of the English Reformation
- North American Martyrs
- Vietnamese Martyrs
- Japanese Martyrs
- Chinese Martyrs
