= English Martyrs =

The term English Martyrs is applied to two groups of people executed by either side of the English Reformation. See:

- List of Catholic martyrs of the English Reformation
  - Forty Martyrs of England and Wales (canonised)
  - One Hundred and Seven Martyrs of England and Wales (beatified)
- List of Protestant martyrs of the English Reformation

English Martyrs may also refer to the following Catholic schools and churches:

- English Martyrs Catholic School, Leicester
- English Martyrs School and Sixth Form College, Hartlepool
- English Martyrs Church, Preston (full name "Church of St Thomas of Canterbury and the English Martyrs")
- English Martyrs' Church, Wallasey, Merseyside
- English Martyrs Church, Tower Hill, London
