= Thomas Woodhouse (disambiguation) =

Thomas Woodhouse was an English priest and martyr.

Thomas Woodhouse or Wodehouse may also refer to:

- Thomas Woodhouse (MP) for Great Yarmouth (UK Parliament constituency)
- Sir Thomas Wodehouse, 2nd Baronet (died 1658), English baronet and Member of Parliament
