= Thomas Bourchier =

Thomas Bourchier may refer to:

- Thomas Bourchier (cardinal) (c. 1404–1486), English archbishop, Lord Chancellor and cardinal
- Sir Thomas Bourchier (died 1510), English knight, Constable of Windsor Castle, nephew of the previous
- Thomas Bourchier (Franciscan) (died 1586?), English Observantine Franciscan and martyrologist

== See also ==
- Claud Thomas Bourchier (1831–1877), English recipient of the Victoria Cross
- Bourchier
