= Thomas Vavasour (disambiguation) =

Thomas Vavasour was a physician.

Thomas Vavasour may also refer to:

- Thomas Vavasour (knight marshal) (1560–1620), MP
- Thomas Vavasour (died before 1636), of the Vavasour baronets
