= Friar Waire =

Friar Waire was an English friar and Catholic martyr who was hanged, drawn, and quartered at St. Thomas Waterings in Camberwell (a brook at the second milestone on the Old Kent Road), on 8 July 1539.

A number of historians record the execution of four men at this time and place, but only John Stowe identifies a Friar Waire as being among their number. Only one of the four is clearly identified, that being John Griffith, also known as Venerable John Griffith Clarke, but it seems clear that two friars were executed alongside him. All were accused of supporting the papal legate Cardinal Reginald Pole, who had refused to endorse Henry VIII's divorce from Catherine of Aragon and was actively trying to incite the Catholic powers of Europe to invade England.

It is possible that Friar Waire is to be identified with Thomas Wyre, one of the signatories to the surrender of the Franciscan friary of Dorchester, 30 September 1538. However, it is uncertain to what order he belonged. If he was a Franciscan it is remarkable that his death is not recorded in the "Grey Friars' Chronicle", and that no mention is made of him in such English Franciscan martyrologists as Thomas Bourchier or Angelus a S. Francisco.

Waire was declared venerable by Pope Leo XIII in 1886
