= Thomas Ashby (martyr) =

Thomas Ashby was an English religious dissident who was executed at Tyburn on 29 March 1544.

He was originally included in the process for canonising the English martyrs, as he had been executed for denying the king's supremacy. However this was later rejected as there was some doubt that he died as a Catholic. "And the xix. day of March [1544] was draune from the tower unto Tyborne . . . . . Ascheby, that was some tyme a prest and forsoke it, and there was hongyd and qwarterd and there byrryd."
