= Edmund Brindholme =

Edmund Brindholme (Brindholm or Bryndeholme) (died 1540) was an English Catholic priest, executed under an act of attainder (32 Hen. 8. c. 60) on a charge of involvement in a plot to betray Calais, then an English possession, to the French.

== Biography ==
Brindholme was parish priest of Our Lady's Church at Calais. It was said that Gregory Botolf, chaplain to Lord Lisle, Governor of Calais, had been to Rome on the business of the conspiracy, and had requested the pope to grant a living in the English Hospital of St. Thomas to Brindholme, who was about to go to Rome when he was arrested. He was examined 11 April 1540, and was attained in the Parliament of that year, together with Clement Philpott, accused of offering assistance to Cardinal Pole.

He was executed at Tyburn, 4 August 1540, together with six others – Robert Bird, Lawrence Cook, Prior of Doncaster, Darby Genning, Giles Heron, William Horne (a Carthusian lay brother) and Clement Philpott (mentioned above).

Edmund Brindholme was declared venerable by Pope Leo XIII in 1886
