= Thomas Belchiam =

16th-century English Franciscan friar and martyr

Venerable Thomas Belchiam

Greenwich Franciscan Martyr of England
- Born: unknown
- Died: 3 August 1537; England
- Venerated in: Roman Catholicism

Thomas Belchiam (1508–1537) was an English Franciscan who died in Newgate Prison in the reign of Henry VIII. He is a Catholic martyr, declared venerable by Pope Leo XIII. The year of death is in question: the Victoria County History for Kent puts the events in 1534. It references Thomas Bourchier's Historia Ecclesiastica de Martyrio Fratrum..., "though the writer assigns them to 1537". Bede Camm places Belchiam's date of death as 3 August 1537. Notes and Queries lists him as dying in 1538.

== Life ==
Belchiam was a friar of the convent at Greenwich. He was imprisoned, with other Franciscans, for refusing to take the oath of the royal supremacy, and declaring the king to be a heretic. He was considered an accomplished preacher, and wrote a sermon on the text, 'Behold, they that wear soft clothing are in kings' houses' (Matt. xi. 8), in which he lashed the vices of the court and the avarice and inconstancy of the clergy. At the intercession of Thomas Wriothesley some of the friars were released. Belchiam was kept in Newgate, where he died of starvation on 3 August 1537.

Belchiam survived the last of his two fellow-prisoners upwards of a month, he likely being the youngest. As he lay dying, "...it so fell out that the frame of the earth gave a surprising shock, that the jail keepers were affrighted, and it was thought to be a universal earthquake...It is said that the king gave orders for the burial of Belchiam, his majesty being startled at the uncommon accidents that happened at his departure out of this life."

A copy of his sermon, found in the prison after his death, was brought to Henry VIII, who was affected by it, but had it burnt. Another copy was preserved by the friars, and Thomas Bourchier, writing in 1583, expressed a hope that it might be published; which apparently was never done.

== Sources ==
- Charles Dodd, Church History (Brussels, 1739);
- Thomas Bourchier, Historia Ecclesiastica de Martyrio Fratrum Ord. D. Francisci (Paris, 1581)
- Luke Wadding, Annales Minorum (Ancona, 1736), tom. XVI;
- Mary Jean Stone, Faithful unto Death (London, 1892).

=== Attribution ===
This article incorporates text from a publication now in the public domain: "Belchiam, Thomas". Dictionary of National Biography. London: Smith, Elder & Co. 1885–1900.
