= Oaten Hill Martyrs =

English Roman Catholic martyrs

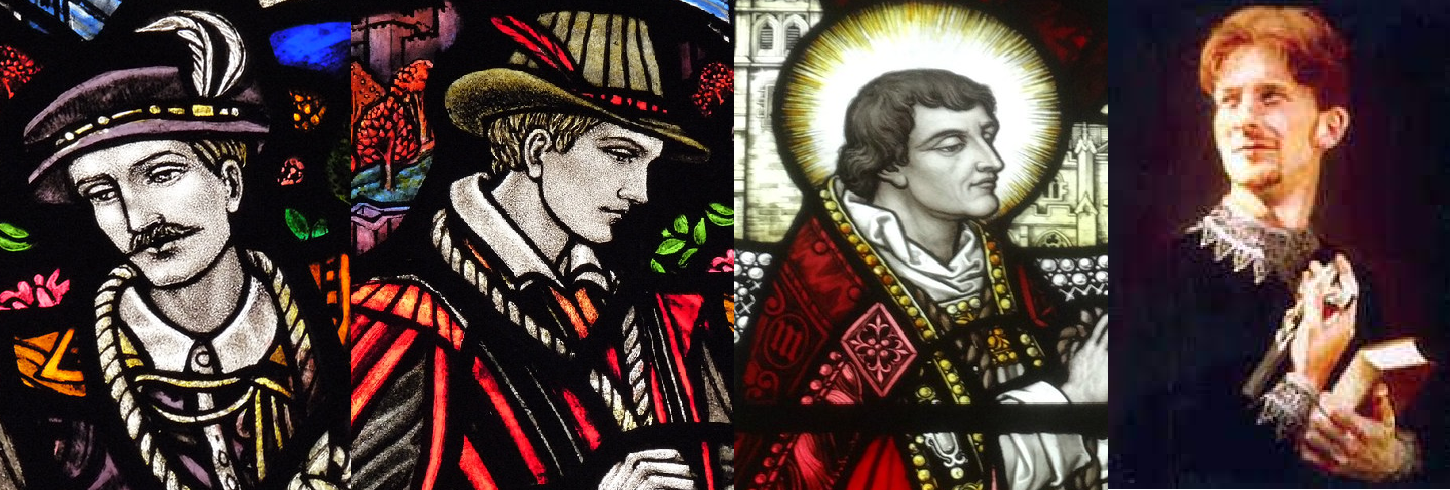
Oaten Hill Martyrs (Blessed Robert Wilcox, Blessed Gerard Edwardes a.k.a. "Edward Campion", Blessed Christopher Buxton and Blessed Robert Widmerpool)

The Oaten Hill Martyrs were Catholic Martyrs who were executed by hanging, drawing and quartering at Oaten Hill, Canterbury, on 1 October 1588. The gallows had been put up in 1576. These four were beatified by Pope Pius XI in 1929.

== Robert Wilcox ==
Blessed Robert Wilcox

Martyr
- Born: c. 1558; Chester, England
- Died: 1 October 1588 (aged 29 - 30); Oaten Hill, Canterbury
- Honored in: Roman Catholicism
- Beatified: 15 December 1929 by Pope Pius XI
- Feast: 1 October

Robert Wilcox was born in Chester, England in 1558 and entered the seminary at Rheims when he was twenty-five years old and was ordained on 20 April 1585. He was sent to England with other priests seeking to expand the Catholic faith and deal with the country's expanding Protestantism under Queen Elizabeth I. Wilcox arrived in England on 7 June 1586 but was arrested almost immediately at Lydd in Kent, near to where he entered the country. As a captive, he was sent to the Marshalsea prison where he was examined on 15 August 1588. Here he admitted he was a Catholic priest and was sent for trial with the others to Canterbury, England. Wilcox was the first of the four to be executed. It is recorded that he told his companions to be of good heart. He was going to heaven before them, where he would carry the tidings of their coming after him. Wilcox was thirty years of age.

== Gerard Edwards ("Edward Campion") ==
Blessed Edward Campion

Martyr
- Born: Gerard Edwards c. 1552; Ludlow, Shropshire, England
- Died: 1 October 1588 (aged 35 - 36); Oaten Hill, Canterbury
- Honored in: Roman Catholicism
- Beatified: 15 December 1929 by Pope Pius XI
- Feast: October 1

Gerard Edwards, a Catholic priest, was born at Ludlow, Shropshire, and studied at Jesus College, Oxford, but left without obtaining a degree, as he was unable to take the Oath of Supremacy. He was for some time in the service of Gregory Fiennes, 10th Baron Dacre. On 22 February 1586 he left England to study for the priesthood in Rheims. In accordance with the custom of many Douai priests of taking an alias for their greater safety on the English mission, he changed his name to "Edward Campion" in honour of St Edmund Campion. Because of his education he was ordained after just a year and returned to England at Easter 1587. He was captured in Sittingbourne, Kent, just a few weeks later, however, and was imprisoned at the Newgate and the Marshalsea prisons in London following questioning by order of the Privy Council on 22 April 1587. Upon a second examination on 14 August 1588, he admitted to being a priest. He was thirty-six years of age at the time of his execution.

== Christopher Buxton ==
Blessed Christopher Buxton

Martyr
- Born: c. 1562; Derbyshire, England
- Died: 1 October 1588 (aged 25 - 26); Oaten Hill, Canterbury
- Honored in: Roman Catholicism
- Beatified: 15 December 1929 by Pope Pius XI
- Feast: October 1

Christopher Buxton (1562 – 1588) was born in Derbyshire in 1562. He was a student of Nicholas Garlick at the Grammar School, Tideswell, Peak District. Garlick entered the English College at Rheims on 22 June 1581. Buxton arrived about a month later.

In 1584 he was sent to the English College in Rome where he was ordained on 26 October 1586. He had a lengthy and difficult journey across Europe, calling in at Rheims on his way to Dieppe. Word had already reached the continent concerning the government's plans to exile or execute the priests then held in prison. A Dr. Darbishire in Paris directed Buxton to delay his departure for the time being, and in obedience complied. But having learned that Darbishire's counsel was not a directive of Father Persons in England, Buxton crossed to Kent in early September 1587.

He was arrested in Kent about two months later, and taken to the Marshalsea prison. On 15 August 1588, he was examined at which time he admitted he was a priest. As he was so young, it was thought that his constancy might be shaken by the sight of the deaths of his companions, and his life was offered to him if he would conform to the new religion; but he answered that he would not purchase a corruptible life at such a price, and that if he had a hundred lives he would willingly surrender them all in defence of his faith.

While in the Marshalsea Prison he wrote a Rituale, the manuscript of which is now preserved as a relic at Olney, Buckinghamshire. He sent this manuscript to a priest, as the last token of his friendship, the day before he was taken from prison. He was taken to Canterbury for trial and execution. Buxton died at the age of twenty-six. Christopher Buxton was beatified by Pope Pius XI in 1929.

== Robert Widmerpool ==
Blessed Robert Widmerpool

Martyr
- Born: c. 1560; Nottinghamshire, England
- Died: 1 October 1588 (aged 27 - 28); Oaten Hill, Canterbury
- Honored in: Roman Catholicism
- Beatified: 15 December 1929 by Pope Pius XI
- Feast: October 1, May 11 as one of the Nottinghamshire Martyrs

Robert Widmerpool, a layman, was born in Nottinghamshire. He attended Gloucester Hall, Oxford, but did not graduate. He obtained a post as tutor at the home of the Countess of Northumberland, and was arrested there for giving aid to a Catholic priest. He was imprisoned with the others at the Marshalsea. When he had the rope round his neck, he thanked God for the glory of dying in Canterbury for the cause for which St. Thomas died. He was twenty-eight years old.

== See also ==
- Canterbury Martyrs - Protestant martyrs
- Catholic Church in the United Kingdom
- Douai Martyrs
- Ralph Crockett
- List of Catholic martyrs of the English Reformation
