= William Atkins (Jesuit) =

English Jesuit priest (1601–1681)

William Atkins (1601–1681) was an English Jesuit.

Atkins was born in Cambridgeshire in 1601. He became a secular priest, and was sent on the English mission in 1631. Four years later he entered the Society of Jesus. In 1653, he was chosen rector of the 'College of St. Aloysius', which at that period comprised the counties of Lancaster and Stafford.

Father Atkins was one of the most remarkable of the victims of Titus Oates's plot. In 1679, he was living at Wolverhampton, being almost an octogenarian, and for six years he had been completely paralysed, bedridden, and nearly speechless. He was charged with high treason in inciting the people to rebellion. The pursuivants dragged him from his bed, and, forcing him into a most incommodious vehicle, conveyed him to Stafford gaol, eleven miles distant.

He was tried at the assizes before Lord Chief Justice Scroggs, on13 August 1679, and condemned to death on account of his sacerdotal character. The sentence was not, however, carried out, and the aged ecclesiastic was allowed to languish in Stafford gaol, where he died, on 17 March 1681.

== Sources ==
- "Atkins, William" . Dictionary of National Biography. London: Smith, Elder & Co. 1885–1900.
