= Richard Sergeant =

English Roman Catholic priest and martyr

Richard Sergeant (executed at Tyburn, 20 April 1586) was an English Roman Catholic priest. He is a Catholic martyr, beatified in 1987.

== Life ==
He was probably a younger son of Thomas Sergeant of Stone, Gloucestershire, by Katherine, daughter of John Tyre of Hardwick. He took his degree at the University of Oxford (20 February 1570–1), and arrived at the English College, Reims, on 25 July 1581.

He was ordained subdeacon at Reims (4 April 1582), deacon at Soissons (9 June 1582), and priest at Laon (7 April 1583). He said his first Mass on 21 April, and left for England on 10 September.

He was indicted at the Old Bailey (17 April 1586) as Richard Lea alias Longe.

== William Thomson ==
Condemned and executed along with Sargeant was William Thomson, a native of Blackburn, Lancashire, who was educated at local schools before going to the English College at Reims, on 28 May 1583. He was ordained priest in the Reims cathedral (31 March 1583–4). Thomson laboured chiefly in London, and was arrested in the house of Roger Line, husband of Anne Line in Bishopsgate Without, while saying Mass.

Both were executed on 20 April 1586 for being Catholic priests and coming into the realm in violation of the Jesuits, etc. Act 1584.

Both were beatified by Pope John Paul II in 1987 and are commemorated on 4 May.

== See also ==
- Douai Martyrs
- Eighty-five martyrs of England and Wales
