= William Hartley (martyr) =

English Roman Catholic priest and martyr

William Hartley (born at Wyn, in Derbyshire, England, of a yeoman family about 1557; executed 5 October 1588) was an English Roman Catholic priest. He is a Catholic martyr, beatified in 1929.

== Life ==
At eighteen he matriculated at St John's College, Oxford, where he became a chaplain. Being removed by the vice-chancellor, Tobias Matthew, in 1579 on suspicion of Catholic tendencies, he went to Reims in August, was ordained at Châlons on 24 February 1580, and returned to England in June of that year.

Hartley helped Robert Parsons and Edmund Campion in printing and distributing their books in England. On 4 August 1581 (Pollen gives 13 August) a search of Stonor Park in Oxfordshire found the press on which Campion's Decem Rationes had been printed. Hartley, along with members of the Stonor family, printers and some servants, were arrested at Stonor Park. Hartley was sent to Marshalsea Prison, London. Here he was detected saying Mass in a cell before Lord Vaux, and for this he was laid in irons on 5 December 1583. He was indicted for conspiracy, despite the fact that he had already been imprisoned in the Marshalsea at the time the alleged conspiracy took place.

In January 1585, he was sent into exile and put on board a ship at Tower Wharf bound for Normandy. He then spent some little time at Reims, recovering his health, and made a pilgrimage to Rome on 15 April 1586, before returning to the English mission.

In September 1588, he was arrested in Holborn, London, and, as his friend Father Warford said, incurred the suspicion of having apostatized. In the aftermath of the Armada, Hartley was executed at Shoreditch on 5 October 1588.

== Companions ==
Less is known of Hartley's companions.

- John Hewitt was son of a draper at York and a student at Caius College, Cambridge. He had once been in York prison, but was arrested in Gray's Inn Lane, London, 10 March 1587, going under the name of Weldon, and died under that name; this had led several early martyrologists into the mistake of making him into two martyrs, Hewett dying at York, and Weldon at London.
- Robert Sutton was a tutor or schoolmaster, born at Kegworth in Leicestershire, who had practiced his profession in Paternoster Row, London. Sometime prior to June 1586, he met there a Mr. Blythe (a.k.a. Oliver Heywoode), an old priest working in the area of Newgate, and converted to Catholicism. He was soon arrested and incarcerated. He was executed at Clerkenwell 5 October 1588.
- John Harrison, alias Symons, had carried letters from one priest to another. As he had before "been slandered to be a spy", his fame suffered some obscurity. It is also hardly doubtful that his name, Harrison, was confounded with that of either Matthias or James Harrison, priests, who suffered martyrdom in 1599 or 1602 respectively. This perhaps explains why his name has fallen out of the process of the English martyrs, and in its place was inserted that of Richard Williams, a "Queen Mary priest" who really suffered four years later.

== John Robinson ==
John Robinson was born in the North Riding of Yorkshire. He married and had a son named Francis, born in 1569. Upon the death of his wife, he entered the English College at Rheims. He returned to England briefly in mid-August 1584 to visit his son, who was the fifteen. The following April, Robinson was ordained and went on the English mission in June. Upon arriving, he immediately took ship for the North. His ship, likely bound for Newcastle, put in at Yarmouth Roads, where he was arrested and sent to The Clink, where he remained for three years. The persecution that broke out after the failure of the Armada brought him to the scaffold. The place set for his execution was Ipswich; Robinson chose to walk. He was hanged, drawn, and quartered on 1 October 1588. His son was ordained five years later.

== Bibliography ==
- Charles Boase, Oxford registers, (Oxford, 1885–89), II, ii, 68
- Catholic Record Society (London, 1906, 1908), II, V
- Richard Challoner, Memoirs, I
- Joseph Gillow, Bibl. Dict. Eng. Cath., s. v.
- Jaeffreson, Middlesex County Records (London, 1886), II, 171, 180
- Lobel, Mary D. (1964). A History of the County of Oxford: Volume 8: Lewknor and Pyrton Hundreds. pp. 98–115.
- The Month, January, 1879, 71-85; January, 1905, 19
