= William Richardson (martyr) =

English Roman Catholic priest and martyr

Blessed William Richardson
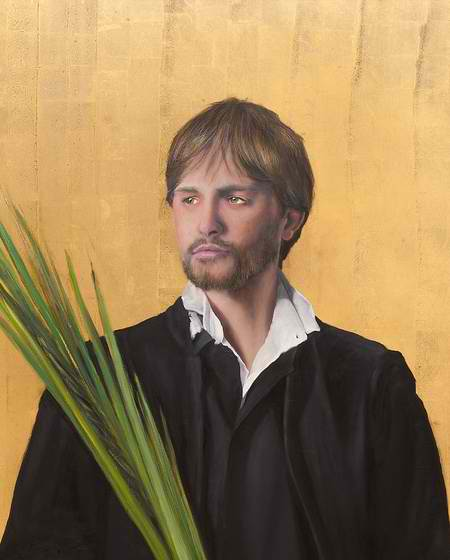
- Born: c. 1572; West Riding of Yorkshire
- Died: 27 February 1603 (aged 30 - 31); Tyburn, London, England
- Beatified: 15 December 1929 by Pope Pius XI
- Feast: 27 February

William Richardson (1572–1603) was a 16th-century Roman Catholic English martyr.

Richardson was born in the village of Wales, West Riding of Yorkshire. He studied for the Roman Catholic priesthood at seminaries in Valladolid and then Seville, both in Spain. He was ordained sometime between 1594 and 1600. William was then sent back to England, where he used the alias William Anderson. Soon after arriving in England, he was betrayed by a trusted person, arrested in London's Gray's Inn (an Inn of Court), and imprisoned. He was tried and convicted within a week and hanged, drawn, and quartered. His was the final martyrdom to take place during the reign of Queen Elizabeth I as she was to die herself within a month.

His feast day is celebrated February 27
