= Gregory Botolf =

English knight and cleric (16th century)

Sir Gregory Botolf, also known as Sir Gregory Sweet-Lips, was an English knight and cleric who fell foul of Henry VIII of England for his adherence to the papacy. He was pursued by Henry's agents in Belgium but was released due to papal pressure.
