= John Almond (martyr) =

English Roman Catholic saint

Saint John Almond

Martyr
- Born: c. 1577; Liverpool
- Died: 5 December 1612 (aged 34 - 35); Tyburn, London
- Venerated in: Roman Catholic Church
- Beatified: 15 December 1929, Rome by Pope Pius XI
- Canonized: 25 October 1970, Rome by Pope Paul VI
- Feast: 5 December, 25 October (with the Forty Martyrs of England and Wales)
- Patronage: Liverpool

John Almond (alias Lathom or Molyneux, c. 1577 – 5 December 1612) was an English Catholic priest. He was ordained in 1598 and suffered martyrdom in 1612. Canonised in 1970, John Almond is one of the Forty Martyrs of England and Wales.

== Early life ==
John Almond was born around 1577 in Allerton, Liverpool, and spent his childhood there and at Much Woolton, Lancashire (now Woolton, Liverpool) until at the age of eight, he was taken to Ireland. He went to the English College in Rome, at the age of twenty, where he was ordained as a priest, returning to England as a missionary in 1602. He concluded his term there by giving the 'Grand Act' -- a public defence of theses which cover the whole course of philosophy and theology—and was warmly congratulated by Cardinals Caesar Baronius and Francesco Maria Tarugi, who presided.

== Return to England and martyrdom ==
He continued to minister to the faithful and laboured in his mission for 10 years, during that time he would eagerly speak out against the anti-Catholic powers of the state.

He returned to the dangers of England in 1602 as a secular priest and administered to the faithful there. He was arrested in 1608, and then again in 1612. In November 1612, seven priests escaped from prison. It was alleged that, whilst in prison, Almond had said that "whosoever had killed a king, and were afterward penitent ... and did confesse the same to a priest, might have absolution".

Before his death, he prayed, distributed alms to the poor, and gave his final oration, concluding with these words: "To use this life well is the pathway through death to everlasting life". During his final speech on the scaffold he condemned regicide, discussed the nature of grace and true repentance, and said that he conceded as much authority to James as to any Christian prince.

John Almond was hanged, drawn, and quartered on 5 December 1612 at Tyburn, London, England.

== Veneration ==
Pope Paul VI canonized John Almond on 25 October 1970. The latest official edition of the Roman Martyrology commemorates the martyr under the date of his martyrdom, 5 December.

A bone relic of Almond survives, which is in the Martyrs' crypt in Tyburn Convent, London.

He is the patron saint of Liverpool.

A book entitled Saint John Almond and the Society of His Time was written by Kenneth Alfred Almond, and the book cover has a detailed drawing of the said martyr. This broad historical study explores the key events of John Almond's life and looks at them in an historical context alongside key events of the 16th and early 17th centuries.

== Legacy ==
A Catholic comprehensive in Garston, Liverpool took the name of the martyr, initially as Blessed John Almond School and then St John Almond Catholic High School. The school is currently The Academy of St Nicholas.
