= Placid Adelham =

English monk and priest

Placid Adelham, O.S.B. was an English monk and priest.

Originally a Protestant minister, John Adelham was born in Wiltshire. He became a Catholic and joined the Benedictine monks, at which time he took the name Placid. He was professed at St. Edward's Monastery, Paris in 1652. He was later the Prior of St. Lawrence's Monastery, at Dieulouard from 1659 to 1661.

Adelham was then sent to England and stationed at Somerset House from 1661 to 1675. Banished that year, he returned to England again and became a victim of the "Popish Plot" of Titus Oates. He was tried and condemned to death as a Catholic priest on 17 January 1678. Though reprieved, he was detained in Newgate Prison, where he died somewhere between the years 1681 and 1685.
