= Martin Sherson =

English priest (1563–1588)

Martin Sherson (1563–1588) was an English Roman Catholic priest.

== Biography ==
A native of Yorkshire, he matriculated at St John's College, Oxford in 1575 at the age of twelve, becoming "a poor scholar of George Mannering who taught Rhetoric there". He arrived at the English College at Reims, 1 April 1580.

He was confirmed by Bishop Goldwell, 11 June 1580; left for Rome, 20 March; and entered the English College, Rome 8 May 1581, aged eighteen, where "through an over-zealous application to study and prayer he began to spit blood". He returned to Reims, 22 June 1585; and was ordained: sub-deacon in the chapel of the Holy Cross in Reims Cathedral, 21 September by Louis de Brezé, Bishop of Meaux; deacon at Laon, 14 March; and priest at Laon, 5 April 1586.

He left for England, 16 June, and was imprisoned in the Marshalsea before 22 December 1586. He was still there in March 1588, and died there soon after, aged twenty-five.
