= Thomas Vavasour =

English Roman Catholic physician

Thomas Vavasour (born about 1536–7 – died at Kingston upon Hull, 2 May 1585) was an English Roman Catholic physician, and pensioner of St John's College, Cambridge.

== Life ==
On 25 June 1549, at the disputations held before the king's commissioners at Cambridge, Vavasour was one of the disputants in favour of Transubstantiation and the Sacrifice of the Mass. He subsequently went to Venice, where he took the degree of Doctor of Medicine, and on 20 November 1556, he received a licence from the College of Physicians of London to practise for two years.

His house was "by the common school house" in the city of York; there Mass was said in 1570. In 1572 he was accused of having entertained Edmund Campion. In Nov. 1574, after he had been confined to his own house for nearly nine months, he was sent into solitary confinement in Hull Castle.

The Calvinist Edmund Grindal describes him as "sophistical, disdainful, and illuding arguments with irrision, when he was not able to solute the same by learning", and adds that "his great anchor-hold was in urging the literal sense of hoc est corpus meum, thereby to prove transubstantiation", a judgement that Vavasour might have regarded as a compliment. By June 1579, he was back again in his house, where Mass was again said.

Later on, he was in the Gatehouse, Westminster, from which he was released on submitting to acknowledge the royal supremacy in religious matters; but he was again imprisoned as a recusant in Hull Castle, where he died. His wife, Dorothy, died in the New Counter, Ousebridge, York, 26 October 1587.
