= John Story (martyr) =

English politician and Roman Catholic martyr (1504–1571)

Blessed John Storey
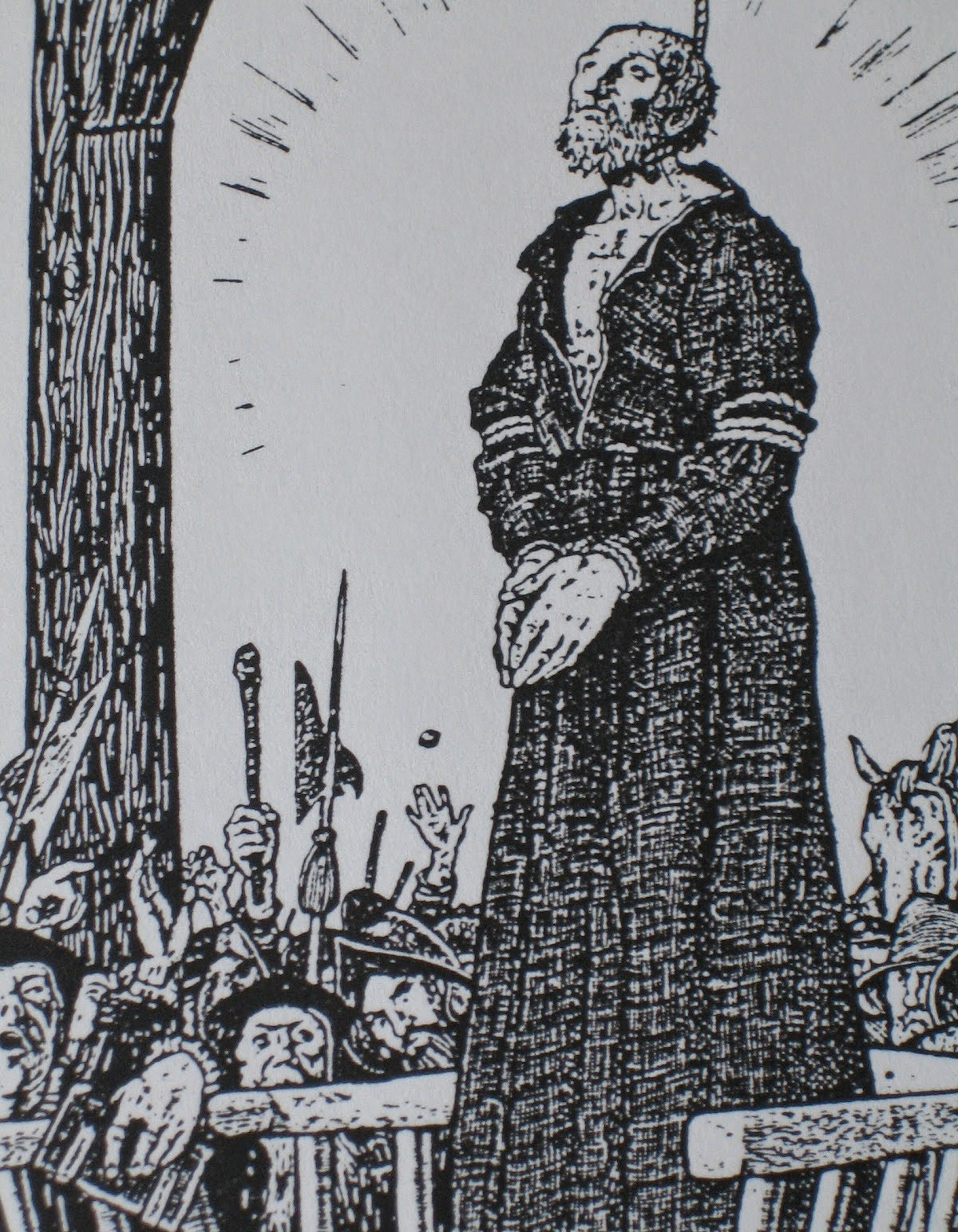

Martyr
- Born: 1504; Northumberland, England
- Died: 1 June 1571; Tyburn, London, England
- Venerated in: Roman Catholic Church
- Beatified: 29 December 1886, Rome by Pope Leo XIII
- Feast: 1 June

John Story (or Storey) (1504 – 1 June 1571) was an English Roman Catholic martyr and Member of Parliament. Story escaped to Flanders in 1563, but seven years later he was lured aboard a boat in Antwerp and abducted to England, where he was imprisoned in the Tower of London, and subsequently executed at Tyburn on a charge of treason.

== Life ==
He was born in 1504, the son of Nicholas and Joan Story of Salisbury. He became a Franciscan tertiary. Story was educated at Hinxsey Hall, University of Oxford, where he became lecturer on civil law in 1535, and two years later became principal of Broadgates Hall, afterwards Pembroke College. He received his D.C.L. in 1538, and the following year resigned his position at Broadgates and was admitted as an advocate at Doctors' Commons. He married Joan Watts.

He appears to have temporarily abjured his Roman Catholic beliefs and took the Oath of Supremacy. In 1544, in recognition of legal services performed in Boulogne for the crown, King Henry VIII confirmed Story in the position of Regius Professor of civil law at Oxford. Having been chosen Member of Parliament for Salisbury in 1545 and Hindon in Wiltshire. Just after the accession of King Edward VI in 1547, Story gained notoriety by his opposition to the Act of Uniformity in 1548. For crying out "Woe unto thee, O land, when thy king is a child," Story was imprisoned by the House of Commons, but he was soon released and went into exile with his family to Louvain, where he became a member of the University.

After the accession of Queen Mary he returned to England in August 1553. His patent as Regius Professor was renewed but he resigned his interest in his position at Oxford, and was made chancellor of the dioceses of London and of Oxford and dean of arches. Queen Mary being now on the throne, Story was one of the officials in prosecuting heresy, and one of her proctors at the trial of Thomas Cranmer at Oxford in 1555.

Under Queen Elizabeth, he was again returned to Parliament (as member for East Grinstead in 1553, Bramber in April 1554, Bath in November 1554, Ludgershall in 1555, and Downton in 1559). On 20 May 1560, he underwent a short imprisonment in the Fleet for "having obstinately refused attendance on public worship, and everywhere declaiming and railing against that religion we now profess."

In 1563, he was again arrested and committed to the Marshalsea, but managed to escape to Flanders, where he became a pensioner of King Philip II, and acted as the King's almoner for the Catholic exiles. Engaged by the Duke of Alba (Alva in Dutch), Governor of the Spanish Netherlands, to prevent the export of heretical books from the Netherlands to England, he was lured onto a trading boat at Antwerp in 1570 and conveyed to Yarmouth and thence to imprisonment in the Tower of London. According to Bede Camm, Story represented the old order, and was well known among the Catholic refugees. Brought home by fraud and violence and then executed, Camm sees this as meant to send a message to the exiles, demonstrating "how strong Elizabeth was to punish and how powerless Spain to protect".

In spite of his claim that he was a Spanish subject, he was tried for high treason (for having supported the Northern Rebellion of 1569 and encouraging the Duke of Alba to invade) and was condemned to death on 2 May 1571. The spectacle of his trial moved St. Edmund Campion, who was present, to reconsider both his own position and his Catholic duty.

He was executed at Tyburn by being hanged, drawn and quartered on 1 June 1571. With the rope around his neck he made a long speech and pleaded on behalf of his wife "who hath four young children".

== Veneration ==
In 1886, John Story was beatified by Pope Leo XIII owing to a papal decree originally approved by Pope Gregory XVI in 1859.
