= Ralph Milner and companion =

English martyrs (died 1591)

Blessed Ralph Milner

Martyr
- Born: Slackstead, Hampshire, England
- Died: 7 July 1591; Winchester, England
- Honored in: Roman Catholic Church
- Beatified: 15 December 1929 by Pope Pius XI
- Feast: 7 July

Ralph Milner (? at Slackstead, Hampshire, England, early in the sixteenth century – executed 7 July 1591 at Winchester) was an English martyr of the Roman Catholic Church. Along with Roger Dicconson (also spelled Dickenson), a Catholic priest, they were martyred at Winchester. Both were beatified in 1929.

== Ralph Milner ==
The greater part of his life was probably passed in his native village, where, being practically illiterate, he supported his wife and eight children by manual labour. He was brought up an Anglican, but became a Catholic convert. On the very day of his first Communion, however, he was arrested for changing his religion and committed to Winchester jail.

Here, his good behaviour meant he was frequently allowed out on parole, and was even trusted with the keys of the prison. This leniency enabled him to introduce priests to administer the sacraments to Catholic prisoners. He then acted as escort first to Father Thomas Stanney, and later to his successor at Winchester, Father Roger Dicconson, conducting them to the different villages to minister to Catholics.

Blessed Roger Dicconson

Martyr
- Born: Lincoln, England
- Died: 7 July 1591; Winchester, England
- Honored in: Roman Catholic Church
- Beatified: 15 December 1929 by Pope Pius XI
- Feast: 7 July

== Roger Dicconson (Dickenson) ==
Nothing much is known of him, except that he was born in Lincoln, and studied for the priesthood in Rheims, France. In 1583, he was sent on a mission to England and was imprisoned soon afterwards, but managed to escape when his guards got drunk. He wasn't very fortunate the second time he was arrested, this time, with Milner, who had been escorting him to other villages.

== Execution ==
Finally seized with Father Dicconson, Milner was with him placed under close confinement in Winchester jail pending the approaching sessions. The judge urged Milner to attend even once the Protestant church and thus escape the gallows. He refused and began to prepare for death. Every effort was made to persuade him to change his purpose and renounce the Catholic faith.

When he was approaching the gallows with Father Dicconson, his children were led to him in the hope that he might even then relent. He was unshaken in his resolution, and gave his children his last blessing. There, the two men were hanged, drawn, and quartered.
