= William Andleby =

English Roman Catholic priest and martyr

Blessed William Andleby

Martyr
- Born: possibly 1552; Etton, East Riding of Yorkshire
- Died: 4 July 1597 (possibly aged 45); York, England
- Venerated in: Roman Catholic Church
- Beatified: 15 December 1929 by Pope Pius XI
- Feast: 4 July

William Andleby (Anlaby) (executed at York, 4 July 1597) was an English Roman Catholic priest. He is a Catholic martyr, beatified in 1929.

== Life ==
William Andleby was born in Etton, Yorkshire, into a gentry family. During the 1560s William attended Pocklington Grammar School in the east Riding of Yorkshire. At 25 he went to the Netherlands to take part in the Dutch war. He visited Douay College out of curiosity and met William Allen; a discussion led to his conversion, and eventually Andleby became a Catholic priest, being ordained 23 March 1577, along with Ralph Sherwin. Andleby returned to England in April 1578.

At first he worked alone. According to Challoner, "For the first four years of his mission he travelled always on foot, meanly attired, and carrying with him usually in a bag his vestments and other things for saying Mass; for his labours lay chiefly among the poor, who were not shocked with such things."

Later Andleby acquired a horse, and around 1587 worked with another Douai priest and native of the Riding, William Atkinson. They travelled widely from Richmond through York to Howden, Hemingbrough and Hull. He is known to have taken his ministry to Robert Tyrwhitt, in Lincolnshire, and also to the Catholic prisoners in Kingston upon Hull's blockhouse.

In 1597, he was arrested and condemned as a Catholic priest. He was executed at York with three laymen: Henry Abbot, Thomas Warcop, and Edward Fulthrop.
