= James Harrison (priest) =

English Roman Catholic priest and martyr

James Harrison (died 22 March 1602) was an English Roman Catholic priest. He is a Catholic martyr.

== Life ==
Born in the Diocese of Lichfield, he studied at the English College at Rheims, and was ordained priest there in September 1583. In the following year he went on the English mission, where he worked unobtrusively.

In the early part of 1602 he was ministering to Catholics in Yorkshire and was resident in the house of a gentleman of the name of Anthony Battie (or Bates). While there, he was arrested by the pursuivants. Together with Battie he was tried at York and sentenced to death for high treason. The charge against Harrison was that he performed the functions of a Catholic priest, and that against Battie was that he had given refuge to Harrison.

The judge left York without fixing the date of execution, but Harrison was informed on the evening of 21 March that he was to die the next morning. Together with Battie, he was hanged, drawn, and quartered. For many years the English Franciscans at Douai kept his head as a relic.

James Harrison was declared venerable by Pope Leo XIII in 1886.
