= Thomas Woodhouse =

English Catholic priest and martyr

Blessed Thomas Woodhouse
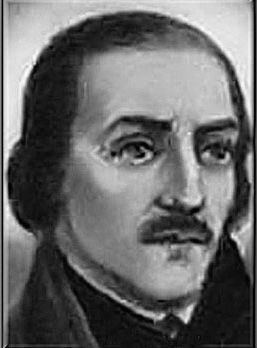
- Born: c. 1535
- Died: 19 June 1573 (aged 37 - 38); Tyburn, London, England
- Venerated in: Roman Catholicism
- Beatified: 29 December 1886 by Pope Leo XIII
- Feast: 19 June

Thomas Woodhouse was an English Catholic priest and martyr at Tyburn on 19 June 1573, being disembowelled alive. He was the first priest executed under Queen Elizabeth.

== Biography ==
Ordained during the latter part of Queen Mary Tudor's reign, he was a Lincolnshire rector for under a year, and in 1560 acted as a private tutor in Wales. However, he resigned that post as well over religious differences.

On 14 May 1561, he was committed to the Fleet, London, having been arrested while saying Mass. For the rest of his life he remained in custody, uncompromising in his opposition to heresy, saying Mass in secret daily, and reciting his Office regularly. In early May 1571, having heard that John Story had been condemned to death for having supported the Rising of the North two years before, Woodhouse offered to take Story's place on the scaffold. After secret negotiations with the Jesuit Provincial of Paris, he was welcomed by letter into the Society of Jesus, (although the Decree of the Congregation of Rites, 4 December 1886, describes him as a secular priest).

Treated with considerable leniency till 19 November 1572, he sent the prison washerwoman to Lord Burghley's house with his famous letter. In it he begs him to seek reconciliation with the pope and earnestly to "persuade the Lady Elizabeth, who for her own great disobedience is most justly deposed, to submit herself unto her spiritual prince and father". Some days later in a personal interview he used equally definite language. Confined then by himself he wrote "divers papers, persuading men to the true faith and obedience", which he signed, tied to stones, and flung into the street.

He was repeatedly examined both publicly and privately. The Queen's private council was inclined to dismiss him as mad. Once, when he had denied the queen's title, someone said, "If you saw her Majesty, you would not say so, for her Majesty is great". "But the Majesty of God is greater", he answered.

Tried in mid-April 1573 at the Guildhall, Woodhouse not only refused to recognize the authority of the judges, but also challenged the jurisdiction of the secular court to judge a priest. Found guilty of treason, he was executed at Tyburn on 19 June 1573 by being hanged, drawn, and quartered. He defiantly argued that the Queen needed to beg pardon from the Pope, leading some in the crowd to cry out "hang him, hang him, this man is worse than Story".

Thomas Woodhouse was beatified by Pope Leo XIII in December 1886; the Jesuits consider him the protomartyr of the Company on English soil. Blessed Thomas Woodhouse is commemorated on 19 June.
