= Miles Gerard =

English Roman Catholic priest and martyr

Blessed Miles Gerard

Martyr
- Born: c. 1550; Wigan, Greater Manchester, England
- Died: 13 April, 1590 (aged 39 - 40); Rochester, Kent, England
- Beatified: 15 December 1929 by Pope Pius XI
- Feast: 13 April

Miles Gerard (born about 1550 at Wigan; executed at Rochester 13 (30?) April, 1590) was an English Roman Catholic priest. He is a Catholic martyr, beatified in 1929.

== Life ==
Descended perhaps from the Gerards of Ince, he was, about 1576, tutor to the children of Squire Edward Tyldesley, at Morleys Hall, near Astley, Lancashire. In 1579 he attended the English College at Douai and Reims. He was ordained 7 April 1583, and then stayed on as professor at the college until 31 August 1589 (O.S.), when he started for England with five companions.

Blessed Francis Dicconson
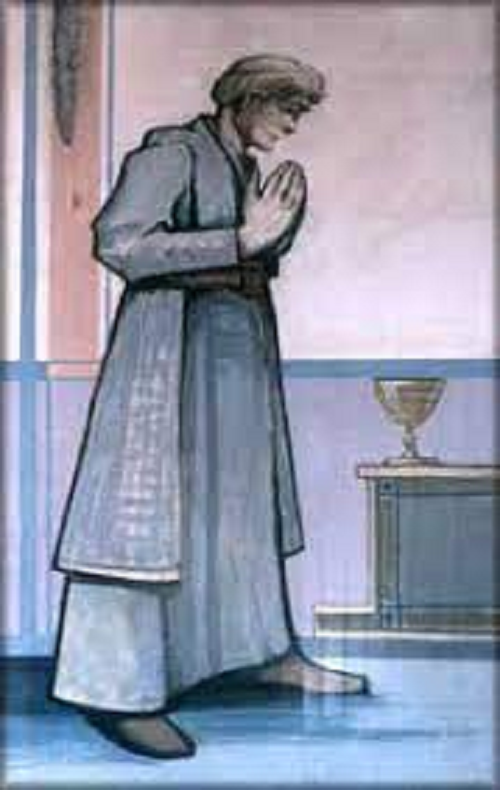

Martyr
- Born: christened 28th October 1564 [1] Otley, West Yorkshire, England
- Died: 13 April 1590 (aged possibly 26); Rochester, Kent, England
- Beatified: 15 December 1929 by Pope Pius XI
- Feast: 13 April

At Dunkirk the sailors refused to take more than two passengers; so the missioners tossed for precedence, and Gerard and Francis Dicconson, the eldest (it seems) and youngest of the party, won. Though bound for London, they were driven out of their course into Dover harbour, where they were examined and arrested on suspicion (24 November, N.S.). A contemporary newsletter says that they were wrecked, and escaped the sea only to fall into the hands of persecutors on shore, but this is not consistent with the official records. These show that the prisoners at first gave feigned names and ambiguous answers, but soon thought it better to confess all.

After torture in London prisons under the notorious Richard Topcliffe, they were condemned as traitors. They were taken to Rochester, where they were hanged and quartered, says Father John Curry, writing shortly afterwards.
