= Laurence Humphreys =

English Catholic martyr (1571–1591)

Blessed Laurence Humphreys

Martyr
- Born: c. 1571; Hampshire
- Died: 7 July 1591 (aged 19 - 20); Winchester, Hampshire, U.K.
- Venerated in: Roman Catholic Church
- Beatified: 15 December 1929 by Pope Pius XI
- Feast: 7 July

Laurence Humphreys (1571 – 7 July 1591) was an English Catholic martyr. He was born in Hampshire, into a Protestant family.

In his youth, he often read the Bible and other religious works and practiced the Corporal and Spiritual Works of Mercy by visiting the sick and those in prison, as well as teaching others about the faith. When he was eighteen years of age, he met several times with the local priest, who persuaded him to convert to Roman Catholicism.

In 1591 he became seriously ill, and while delirious called Queen Elizabeth a harlot and a heretic while in this state. These words were overheard, and before he had completely recovered he was arrested and committed to Winchester jail. At his trial, he claimed to have no recollection of saying such things about the queen, but he did not dispute the evidence placed before him and was willing to be punished because of his actions of which he had no memory. He was later condemned and executed at the Barditch (or City Ditch).

Laurence Humphreys was beatified by Pope Pius XI in 1929. His feast day is 7 July.
