= Thomas Bourchier (Franciscan) =

Thomas Bourchier (d. 1586?) was an English Observantine Franciscan and martyologist.

== Life ==
He was probably educated at Magdalen Hall, Oxford, but there is no record of his having graduated in that university. When Queen Mary attempted to re-establish the friars in England, Bourchier became a member of the new convent at Greenwich; but on the queen's death he left the country. After spending some years in Paris, where the theological faculty of the Sorbonne conferred on him the degree of doctor, he travelled to Rome. He at first joined the convent of the Reformed Franciscans at the church of S. Maria di Ara Coeli, and taught at Genoa and Turin. Subsequently, he became penitentiary in the church of S. Giovanni in Laterano, where John Pits, his biographer, speaks of having sometimes seen him. Bourchier died, according to Pits, at Rome about 1586.

== Works ==
He wrote several books, but the only one that survives is the Historia Ecclesiastica de Martyrio Fratrum Ordinis Divi Francisci dictorum de Observantia, qui partim in Anglia sub Henrico octavo Rege, partim in Belgio sub Principe Auriaco, partim et in Hybernia tempore Elizabethæ regnantis Reginæ, idque ab anno 1536 usque ad hunc nostrum præsentem annum 1582, passi sunt. The preface is dated from Paris, 1 January 1582. Other editions were brought out at Ingolstadt in 1583 and 1584, Paris in 1586, and at Cologne in 1628.

Another of his possible works was a treatise entitled Oratio doctissima et efficacissima ad Franciscum Gonzagam totius ordinis ministrum generalem pro pace et disciplina regulari Magni Conventus Parisiensis instituenda, Paris, 1582. This was published under the name of Thomas Lancton, or Lacton, perhaps an alias of Bourchier. Luke Wadding calls him, in his supplementary volume, 'Thomas Bourchier Gallice, Lacton vero Anglice, et Latinis Lanius, vel Lanio, Italis autem Beccaro' (an alternative form of Beccajo), and elsewhere expresses himself convinced of the identity of Lancton and Bourchier. Francis a S. Clara and Anthony Parkinson, the author of 'Collectanea Anglo-Minoritica,' consider Bourchier and Lancton to be distinct.

Another treatise by Bourchier, De judicio religiosorum, in quo demonstratur quod a sæcularibus judicari non debeant, is mentioned by Wadding as in his possession, but only in manuscript; this was written at Paris in 1582. In 1584 he edited and annotated the Censura Orientalis Ecclesiæ de præcipuis Hæreticorum dogmatibus, which was published by Stanislaus Socolovius.
