= Sheen Friary =

Sheen Proiry later also known as Richmond Priory (1414-1539) was a priory in Surrey, England, restored as a national gathering of Carthusians by Maurice Chauncy at Sheen under Mary I of England during part of her reign from 1553 to 1558.

== Context and location ==
Sheen was one of nine English medieval priories of the Carthusian order, a generally silent, enclosed order as with other orders promoting Christian theology and values in an age of frequent wars and occasional famine, providing charity for the destitute and natural medicine. The London Charterhouse a few miles ENE was particularly less reclusive order, not merely caring for the sick but founding a school, Charterhouse School, which is today a large fee-paying, selective school of pre-17th century date. Today its site in Richmond, Surrey is in Greater London and the site occupied by housing and businesses. Charterhouse School has moved to a rural part of Surrey. The next and extant Catholic foundation in the county is Chilworth Friary, built in 1892, near to Guildford. The site adjoined existing Richmond Palace to its south.

== Evolution ==
=== Endowment and war with France ===
In 1414 Henry V of England founded at Sheen this priory, known as the House of Jesus of Bethlehem, 'for forty monks of the Carthusian order'.

The foundation charter describes the site in detail: built on the north side of the royal manor house, on a piece of land 3,125 feet by 1,305 feet 8 inches extending from 'Hakelok' by 'Diverbussh' on the south to the cross called 'Crosasshe' on the north. The buildings were large with thirty sets of chambers around the great court or cloister, which suggests the planned scale was reduced. According to the Carthusian rule each monk lived and fed apart, they only met in common in choir and chapter.

The considerable endowments in this royal foundation largely consisted of the possessions of the suppressed foreign priories, archaically also called 'alien': Ware Priory, Hayling Priory, Carisbrooke Priory, Lyre Abbey (parent abbey of Hinckley Priory) and Lewisham Priory; the dispossessed manors of East Greenwich and East Combe — or 700 marks out of the royal revenue if these should ever be recovered; the weir of neighbouring Petersham with fishery rights; and the Crown-administered manor of East Hendred.

The spiritualities included the right to appoint vicars and benefices including churchlands and rectorial tithe of the four churches of the town of Wareham in Dorset; the market towns of Ware and Lewisham and village-size parishes of four rural parishes in Northamptonshire; Marden, Kent; three in Hampshire; seven in the Isle of Wight; four in Berkshire; seven parishes with tithes of various other lordships in Herefordshire; three parishes with tithes of other lordships in Gloucestershire; three parishes and tithes of the forest of Malvern; Elmdon in Essex; Hellingly, in Sussex; and Padbury in Buckinghamshire all named in the fully cited County History of 1911.

Another royal gift of the founder was that of four pipes of red wine annually at Candlemas.

Authorised by the Parliament of Leicester, this expropriation of French interests saw strong protest: the Benedictine abbot and convent of St. Evroul, Normandy, wrote an earnest appeal to Sheen in the year 1416, to restore the property which had belonged to them for centuries. In their case, as they stated in this letter, their English possessions had been their chief source of income, and at one time had supplied them with £2,000 a year. Owing to frequent wars between France and England they had of late obtained nothing from this source, and had so been obliged to reduce their choir monks from forty to less than twenty. They appealed to justice and ecclesiastical traditions, stating that no state policy or fear of foreign wars could justify Sheen in retaining that property. Eleven years they protested and in 1427 carried their case to Rome but failed.

=== Illustrative example of lifestyle ===
An authentic Latin set of abstracts of charters and other particulars relating to the possessions of the alien priories of Ware and Hayling and the rest of the endowments have been kept in London at the British Library. Among the Lansdown manuscripts, is one on small 15th century vellum: a Formulare et Consuetudinarium Carthusianorum de Shene in com. Surr. It opens with the form of receiving postulants and novices, in English, inserted on paper. On the postulant seeking admission the prior first asked four questions, as to whether the candidate had been professed in any religious order, whether he had any impediment to taking holy orders, whether he was suffering from any incurable disease, or whether he was in debt or owed any money? If these were answered satisfactorily, the candidate retired, and the prior addressed the chapter:

Venerable Fathers, you have heard his humble petition, you see with what earnest desire he solisets [solicits] to be receaved [received] to our order. Bee pleased therefore, to let me knowe your mindes wheather you judg him fit to be admitted or noe. What thinke you father Vicar? etc.

The candidate was then recalled if the decision of the chapter was favourable. On re-admission the following was the procedure:

Pr. Quid petis?
Postulans prostratus. Misericordiam.
Pr. Surge.
Post. Supplico, etc.

Pr. [in modern orthography] The convent hath deliberated of your humble petition. And now our Statutes do appoint me briefly to set before your eyes the strictness and austerity of our order, and the length and prolixity of the divine office as well of the day office as the night office, which in the winter is far longer, besides the office of our Blessed Lady which you are to say daily in your cell; moreover you are to say yearly a hundred dead offices in private, likewise many Psalters (or as we term them monachales) which you are yearly to say unless you perform them in masses. For your clothing and lodging after you have received the habit you can make no further use of linen except handkerchiefs, towels and the like, but for your body you are to wear a shirt of hair and a cord about your loins and a woolen shirt. You are to lie upon straw or a bed of chaff with a blanket between. For your diet it is a perpetual abstinence from flesh insomuch that in the greatest or most dangerous sickness you can expect no dispensation therein. Also a good part of the year we abstaine from all white meats, as in Advent, Lent and all the Fridays of the year, besides many other fasts both of the church and of our order in which we abstain from white meat.

Likewise from the exaltation of the holy Cross until Easter we fast with one meal a day except some few days of recreation before Advent and Lent. For silence and solitude it ought to be perpetual except when our Statutes giveth license or that you ask leave. These be the general observances of our order common to all as well as seniors as juniors. But besides these general there are some particular ordained and appointed for novices or newly professed to exercise them in the purgative way, and for their sooner attaining of humility and solid virtue. As is the dressing up of Alters, sweeping of churches and chapels, making clean of candlesticks, serving of others and suchlike. Which works by how much they are more vile and contemptible in the eyes of the world, by so much they are more precious and meritorious in the sight of Almighty God, and by how much that men, weather more noble better learned or of greater talents doth willingly and affectionately perform the same for the love of God by so much sooner they will obtain remission of their sins, be purged from their reliques, be freed from their former evil habits and obtain purity of heart humility and other solid virtues, which are not gotten without humiliation and therefore those who do fly or withdraw themselves from ye [these] works of humility, do deprive themselves of the best means to gain the virtue itself. These according to our Statutes and the Custom of our house I have laid unto you. Putas te ista posse performare?

The postulant made reply in Latin, that with the help of God and the prayers of the brethren, he trusted to be enabled to fulfil the rules. Then he knelt before the prior, and placed his hands within those of the prior, whilst the superior stated that he admitted him to the fellowship (societatem) of the order, but that before his profession he had liberty to depart.

The old book has 8 other Latin sections and the procedure for receiving lay brothers set out by the chapter of the Victoria County History of 1911 dealing with such institutions.

=== Expansion and visits ===
By his will of 1415 Henry V. left 1,000 marks for the completion of the house of Sheen for forty monks and bidding his executors see that the number was sustained.

In 1416 an 'anchorage' or hermitage for a recluse was founded, endowed with an annual rent of twenty marks issuing out of the manors of Lewisham and Greenwich; the first recluse or chaplain to occupy it was John Kingstone.

An inspection and confirmation were granted to Sheen by Edward IV in 1461 of the foundation charter and of the further grant by Henry VI in 1442 of 64 acres (0.26 km^{2}) in Sheen and that they might pray for the good [e]state of the king and Cicely his mother and for their souls after death, and the souls of the king's father Richard, late Duke of York, and his ancestors.

Licence was granted in June 1466 to the prior and monks to make a subterranean conduit from a spring called 'Welwey,' alias 'Pickwelleswell,' and to repair the pipes when necessary; Henry V had granted them leave to make a conduit from a spring called 'Hillesdenwell,' but the supply of water was insufficient.

In July 1474 the prior obtained [royal] licence for it to repossess upon mortmain land, tenements and rents to the value of £50 yearly.

Edward IV in 1467 granted to his Queen Elizabeth (Woodville) the manor and lordship of Sheen to hold for life, and she by letters patent of 1 April 1479 granted to the prior and the monks 48 acres (0.19 km^{2}) in West Sheen, parcel of the manor to hold for her life whereupon the king by letters patent of 25 May confirmed this estate and granted it to them in free alms for ever.

On 4 August 1480 the priory obtained licence for the acquisition in mortmain of lands, tenements and rents to the value of £100 yearly.

It is related of Godwin, a monk of this convent, that in the latter end of March 1502 he murdered the prior of the house in a cellar of uncertain name.

On Sunday, 12 January 1510, Henry VIII was here and made an offering of 33s. 4d (equivalent to £2,000 in 2025). Among the alms of Katharine of Aragon for the year 1529 was £7 6s. 8d. to Sheen.

In 1516 licence was obtained by Thomas Pygot and Richard Broke, serjeants-at-law, and others to add to it possessions to the annual value of £15 15s. including the manor of Portpole and lands in St. Andrew's, Holborn.

Dr. John Colet, a learned dean of St. Paul's, was allowed to build himself lodgings within the precincts. When he began to suffer 'sweating sickness' he retired to Sheen, 'spending the little remainder of his days in devotion and "surrendered up at length his last breath to Him that first gave it on the 16th of September 1519." His body was taken back to St. Paul's for burial.

On 28 April 1528 the prior as visitor of the order agreed to exchange with convent "the Salutation, near London" the City of London tenement of late Sir Robert Reede, chief justice of the Common Pleas for other lands more profitable.

In March 1530 the prior was one of three parties to an indenture (in this instance a sort of apprenticeship) devised for finding two secular priests for All Angels Chapel beside Breynford Brygg (Brentford Bridge) in the market town on the opposite bank of the Thames across its tributary, the Brent some way to the north.

On 1 November 1530, the prior granted to the king the convent's possessions in Lewisham and East Greenwich, and in 1531 exchanged with the King these manors for the site and precinct of the late priory of Bradwell with lands in nine parishes of Buckinghamshire and two of Northamptonshire, together with seven advowsons, as held by John Ashby, the late prior; also the chantry lands of Beddington, and other lands lately from Cardinal's College (Christ Church), Oxford.

== Guild in Bagshot ==
In July 1480 the prior in conjunction with Robert Houglot, Richard Newbryge, clerk, and four others, obtained licence to found a perpetual guild or fraternity for themselves and other persons, both men and women. The brethren and sisters were to elect from themselves yearly a warden for the governance of the guild and the custody of its possessions; the fraternity was to have a common seal and to be termed the G[u]ild of St. Mary in Bagshot. Licence was also given to acquire in mortmain lands and rents to the value of £10 yearly, to find a chaplain to celebrate in the chapel there for the good [e]state of the king and queen and of the brethren and sisters of the gild, and for their souls after death, and to do other works of piety according to the ordinance of the founders.

== Tomb (lost) ==
According to Stowe's history of the battle, the body of James IV of Scotland was emtombed above ground here in lead after the Battle of Flodden in 1513. This statement is supported by a passage in a book called The Flower of Fame, printed in 1575. A line of Scottish historians has steadily maintained that the body found and conveyed to London and then to Sheen was not his.

== Measures against the priory under Henry VIII ==
In common with other English Carthusians, Sheen was very reluctant to take the oath of supremacy in favour of Henry VIII which was generally enforced in 1534. The Carthusians were almost as zealous in opposing the royal action as were the Friars Observant. On 7 May 1534 agents Roland, Bishop of Lichfield, and Thomas Bedyll wrote to Thomas Cromwell that they had accomplished the business at Sheen, the prior, convent, and novices having taken the oath. The prior and proctor had shown themselves honest men and faithful subjects, and exhorted the Observants of Richmond to do the same. A letter to Lord Lisle, of 13 May, mentions however that the priors of the Charterhouses of London and Sheen were both [imprisoned] in the Tower.

There is also a letter of this year, apparently of the month of August, from one John Pyzaunt, a monk of Sheen, to Sir John Alayn, alderman of London, which though loyal to his house and order, shows that there was difference of opinion amongst the brethren. He asked for Sir John's intercession with 'Mr. Secretary,' for, though many of them were ready to conform with the king's wishes, 'others I think will rather die from a little scrupulosity of conscience, and would not give way for sorrow and despair of salvation, losing peradventure both body and soul which were greatly to be lamented.' He besought the alderman to speak some good word for the obstinate ones that they might be suffered and borne with. Henry Man, proctor of the house, which was the title of the third official, was the leader of those who were apparently ready to comply with the king's wish.

Henry's commissioned Valor Ecclesiasticus of 1535 showed that the clear annual value of this house was a well above average sum: £800 5s. 4½d (equivalent to £600,000 in 2025).

In June 1535 Robert Marshall, one of the Sheen monks, wrote to Cromwell stating that he had of late been at home in the house of Sheen, and made inquiry whether the king's commission sent by the Bishop of Winchester for the king's supremacy was declared among the brethren in their chapterhouse, and to strangers and others in church every Sunday and holy day. He asserted that this had not been done, adding that those of his brethren who were the king's friends were shocked and greatly offended with vicar and proctor. As a true subject Marshall declared that he felt he must reveal this matter to Cromwell.

Writing to Cromwell on 8 August 1536 this prior stated that his 'lordship' had put in the commission for the visitation of their religion that the brethren should preach within their monasteries. He understood this to mean that their priors who might ride abroad should preach also in other churches, but wanted assurance on this point. In March 1538 Prior Henry showed himself amenable to Cromwell's wishes in the matter of the advowson of Godshill on the Isle of Wight.

On Easter Day 1538 one Dr. Cottys, a secular priest, preached in the charter-house, Sheen, a sermon which was said to be sinister and seditious. A version of parts of it was sent to Cromwell by Robert Singleton. 'To be brief,' wrote Singleton, 'the sermon seemed to be to blaspheme against the king and you that be of his council, and to seduce the people from the Son of Man to the abomination standing in the Holy Place.'

The house surrendered, through the influence of Prior Man, early in 1539. The prior was assigned the great pension of £133 6s. 8d. and small sums to eighteen of the other monks. The prior's complacency was further rewarded by his being made dean of Chester, and in 1546 he was promoted to be Bishop of the Isle of Man, retaining his deanery in commendam.

Maurice Chauncy, the last prior of Sheen, was one of the few religious of the London charterhouse who purchased their lives from Henry VIII. by compliance with his wishes, and on its dissolution obtained a pension of £5. In his later penitence in France he bewailed that he had not shared in any martyrdom, and spoke of himself as 'the spotted and diseased sheep of the flock.' The Carthusians, who were for a short time gathered together under Prior Maurice at Sheen during Mary's reign, were the scattered remnant of the various English charterhouses. Several died during their brief stay at the restored house, and the rest followed their superior into exile when Elizabeth I of England took the throne. Prior Maurice died at Paris on 12 July 1581; two years later his history of the sufferings of the Carthusians under Henry VIII. was printed, of which in the Catholic Revival movement Froude made a stirring account.

=== Subsequent use ===
The buildings was granted in 1540 to Edward Seymour, Earl of Hertford, afterwards Duke of Somerset; and on his attainder (fall) in 1552 in the brief Tudor reign of Edward VI of England, Henry Grey, Duke of Suffolk kept house on the site. On 26 January 1557, Queen Mary replaced the Carthusian monks in their house of Sheen, making Maurice Chauncy their new prior, and granting them a moderate endowment. With the accession of Elizabeth however the few religious houses that Mary had refounded were again dissolved, and Sheen once more became Crown property.

== Priors recorded in sources ==
- John Widrington, elected 1414
- John Bokyngham, 1431
- John Ives, records of 1461
- William Wildy, records of 1474 and 1477
- John Ingilby, 1479-80
- John Jobourn, 1504, resigned 1534
- Brian, elected 1534
- Henry Man, records of 1535-9
- Maurice Chauncy, of informal gathering, 1557

== Seals ==
The fifteenth century pointed oval seal represented the Nativity of Our Lord, with the star of Bethlehem above, and a demi-angel holding a scroll. In the base are the quartered arms of France and England. Legend: SIGILLU: COVĒ: DOMUS: IDŪ DE: BETHLEEM: IUXTA: SHEEN: ORDINIS: CARTUYS.

A smaller pointed oval seal of fifteenth century has the Nativity scenically. The shield of France and England and the legend are the same.

The seal of the latter foundation by Mary I was a very crude depiction of the Nativity with legend: JESU · BETHLEHEM · SHEENE.
