= Lare =

Lare may refer to:

- Lare (Ethiopian District)
- the Lare dialect of the Gallong language, spoken in Northeast India
- Larré, Morbihan, known in Breton as Lare, a commune in France
- Larè, a village in Gassam Department, Burkina Faso

== People with the name ==
- Aron van Lare (born 2003), Dutch footballer
- Frank E. Van Lare (1900–1971), American businessman and politician
- Jeff LaRe (born 1976), American politician
- Laré Mohamed Diarra, Burkina Faso footballer
- William Bedford Van Lare, Ghanaian jurist and diplomat

== See also ==
- Lares (disambiguation)
- Larre (disambiguation)
- Lair (disambiguation)
- Lari (disambiguation)
- Laer, municipality in North Rhine-Westphalia, Germany
