= Parastenolechia collucata =

Scientific classification
- Domain: Eukaryota
- Kingdom: Animalia
- Phylum: Arthropoda
- Class: Insecta
- Order: Lepidoptera
- Family: Gelechiidae
- Genus: Parastenolechia
- Species: P. collucata

Binomial name
- Parastenolechia collucata (Omelko, 1988)

Synonyms
- Laris collucata Omelko, 1988

Species of moth

Parastenolechia collucata is a moth of the family Gelechiidae. It is found in Korea and the Russian Far East.

The wingspan is about 14 mm. Adults are similar to Parastenolechia claustrifera.
