= Sheen Anglorum Charterhouse =

Monastery in Belgium

Sheen Anglorum Charterhouse, also known as the Charterhouse of Jesus of Bethlehem and as Nieuwpoort Charterhouse (Dutch: Kartuize Nieuwpoort), was a community of English Carthusians in exile in what is now Belgium after 1539 and the Dissolution of the Monasteries. The name is derived from the former Sheen Priory, and "Anglorum" means "of the English" in Latin.

The community was located successively in: Bruges (Val-de-Grâce) (1559–1569); Bruges (Sinte-Clarastraat) (1569–1578); Namur (1578); Louvain (1578–1589); Antwerp (1589–1591); Malines (1591–1626); and Nieuwpoort (1626–1783). The charterhouse at Nieuwpoort achieved stability, and endured until, as part of the rationalist reforms of the Emperor Joseph II, it was suppressed in 1783.

One of the first priors was Maurice Chauncy (d. 1581). John Duckett, prior in the early 17th century, was the son of Blessed James Duckett (martyred at Tyburn 19 April 1601) and the uncle of Blessed John Duckett (martyred at Tyburn 7 September 1644). Others connected with the community were Francis Nicholson (1650–1731) and Theodore Augustine Mann (1735–1809), prior from 1764 to 1777.

The last prior, Father Williams, died at Little Malvern Court on 2 June 1797. His papers, the seal of Sheen Anglorum and various relics passed into the possession of the Carthusians of Parkminster.
