= Werner Rolevinck =

Werner Rolevinck (1425–1502) was a Carthusian monk and historian who wrote about 50 titles. He was born near Laer, Westphalia, the son of a wealthy farmer. In 1447 he entered Cologne Charterhouse, where he later died. His most famous work was his history of the world from Creation to Pope Sixtus IV, the Fasciculus temporum ("Little bundles of time"), which was published in many editions and translations between 1474 and 1726, including almost 40 editions during his lifetime. His other well-known work was a description of the manners and customs of his native land entitled De laude veteris Saxsoniæ nunc Westphaliæ dictæ. His master work was translated into French in 1495 by Pierre Desrey as Fleurs et manières des temps passés.
