= Lair =

Lair might be a retreat or may refer to:

- Lair (novel), a 1979 novel by James Herbert
- Lair (video game), a 2007 video game
- The Lair, a 2007–2008 American gay-themed vampire television series
- The Lair (2022 film), a 2022 action horror film
- The Lair (Dreamworld), an exotic animal exhibit at the Dreamworld theme park on the Gold Coast, Australia

== People ==
- James William Lair (1924–2014), American intelligence officer
- Mark Lair (born 1947), American bridge player
- Mike Lair (1946–2017), American politician
- Patrice Lair (born 1961), French football coach

=== Characters ===
- Irma Lair, a fictional character in the comic book W.I.T.C.H. and animated series of the same name

== Places ==
=== United States ===
- Lair, Kentucky, an unincorporated community

== See also ==
- Den (disambiguation)
- Lare (disambiguation)
- Laer
- Liar (disambiguation)
