= Nicholas of Lyra =

French biblical scholar (died 1349)

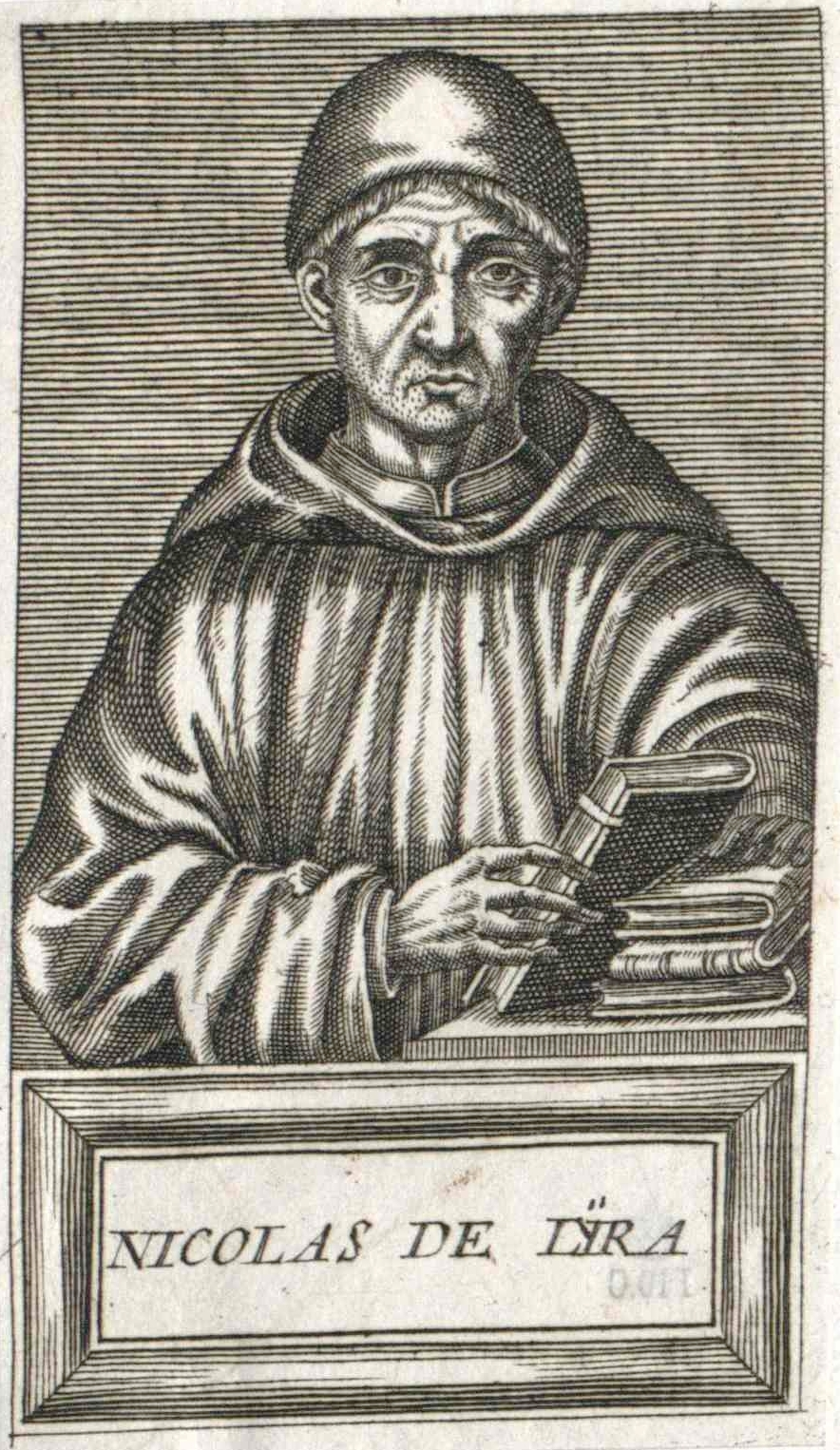
Nicolas de Lyra

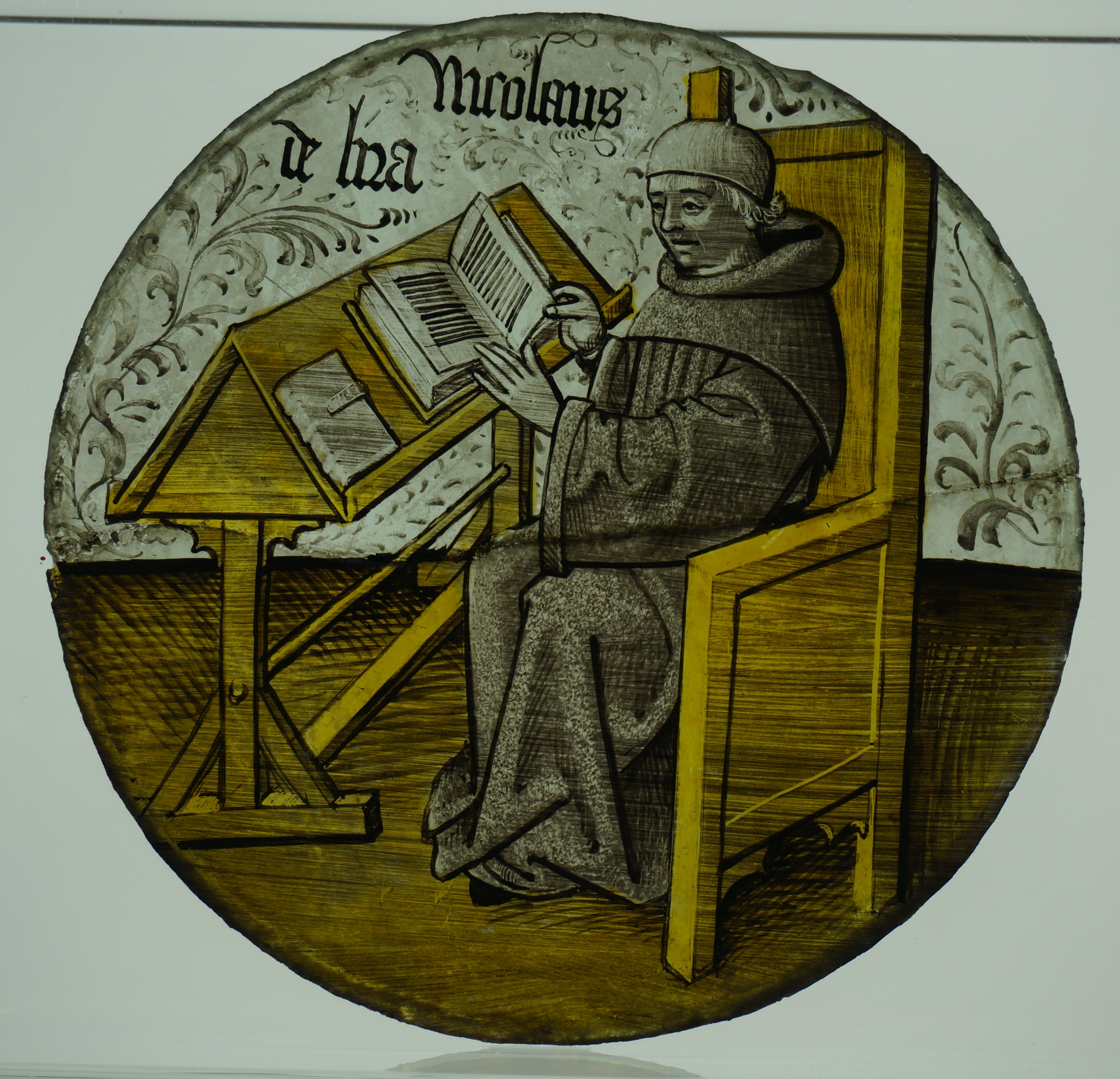
1479

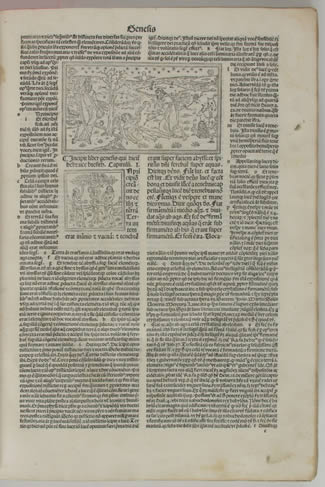
A page of Genesis in Postillae perpetuae... Basel, 1498: the first printed biblical exegesis: space has been left for a hand-lettered red initial (a rubric) that was never added to this copy.

Nicholas of Lyra (French: Nicolas de Lyre; c. 1270 – October 1349), or Nicolaus Lyranus, a Franciscan teacher, was among the most influential practitioners of biblical exegesis in the Middle Ages. Little is known about his youth, aside from the fact of his birth, around 1270, in Lyre, Normandy.

== Biography ==
Rumors from the fifteenth century that Nicholas was born into a religiously-Jewish family have been dismissed by some modern scholars. For example, Deanna Copeland Klepper cites that "as his fifteenth-century critic, Bishop Paul of Burgos (a converted Jew himself) noted, Nicolas’s knowledge of Hebrew and rabbinic interpretation was too limited to reflect a Jewish upbringing."

In 1291, he entered the Franciscan order in the convent of Verneuil-sur-Avre. He was a doctor at the Sorbonne by 1309 and ten years later was appointed the head of all Franciscans in France. His major work, Postillae perpetuae in universam S. Scripturam, was the first printed commentary on the Bible. Printed in Rome in 1471, it was later available in Venice, Basel, and elsewhere. In it, each page of biblical text was printed in the upper center of the page and embedded in a surrounding commentary (illustration, right). His Postilla super totam Bibliam was published by Johannes Mentelin of Strasbourg in 1472.

Nicolas of Lyra's approach to explicating Scripture was firmly based on the literal sense, which for him is the foundation of all mystical or allegorical or anagogical expositions. He deplored the tortured and elaborated readings being given to Scripture in his time. The textual basis was so important that he urged that errors be corrected with reference to Hebrew texts, an early glimmer of techniques of textual criticism, though Nicholas recognized the authoritative value of the Church's Tradition:

I protest that I do not intend to assert or determine anything that has not been manifestly determined by Sacred Scripture or by the authority of the Church... Wherefore I submit all I have said or shall say to the correction of Holy Mother Church and of all learned men... (Second Prologue to Postillae).

Nicholas utilized all sources available to him, fully mastered Hebrew and drew copiously from Rashi and other rabbinic commentaries, the Pugio Fidei of Raymond Martini and of course the commentaries of Thomas Aquinas. His lucid and concise exposition, his soundly-based observations made Postillae the most-consulted manual of exegesis until the 16th century. Martin Luther depended upon it. He used his commentaries extensively in his own work on the book of Genesis, "Lectures on Genesis". He also highly praised his works in the Table Talk. When E. A. Gosselin compiled a listing of the printed editions of works by Nicolaus de Lyra, it ran to 27 pages (in Traditio 26 (1970), pp 399–426).

He was born in the village of La Vieille-Lyre, Normandy, hence his name. Like others in the 14th century, he was occupied by the possibility of the conversion of the Jews, to whom he dedicated hortatory addresses. He wrote Pulcherrimae quaestiones Iudaicam perfidiam in catholicam fide improbantes, which was one of the sources Martin Luther used in his On the Jews and Their Lies.

== Sources ==
- Philippe Bobichon, « Nicolas de Lyre dans la littérature hébraïque et juive : XIVe-XVIIe siècles » in : G. Dahan (dir.) : Nicolas de Lyre, franciscain du XIVe siècle exégète et théologien, Études Augustiniennes. Série « Moyen Âge et Temps modernes, 48, Paris, 2011, pp. 281-312 online
- Philip D. W. Krey and Lesley Smith, editors, Nicholas of Lyra: The Senses of Scripture (fifteen essays by various authors: the first modern study)
- Klaus Reinhardt, "Das Werk des Nikolaus von Lyra im mittelalterlichen Spanien", Traditio 43 (1987): 321–358.

== Translations ==
- Les Postilles et Expositions des Évangiles (in French), translated by Pierre Desrey, Paris: Pierre et Guillaume Le Rouge, 1492
- Apocalypse Commentary, translated by P Krey, Kalamazoo, MI, 1997
- The Postilia of Nicholas of Lyra on the Song of Songs, translated by JG Kiecker, Milwaukee, MI, 1998
