= Den =

Den may refer to:

- Den (room), a small room in a house
- Maternity den, a lair where an animal gives birth

== Media and entertainment ==
- Den (album), 2012, by Kreidler
- Den (Battle Angel Alita), a character in the Battle Angel Alita manga series
- Den (film), a 2001 independent horror film
- Den (comics), name of 2 comic book characters
- Den Watts, or "Dirty Den", a character in the British soap opera EastEnders
- Den, a character in Thomas & Friends
- The Day (Kyiv), a Ukrainian newspaper

== People ==
- Den (pharaoh), pharaoh of Egypt from 2970 BC
- Den Brotheridge (1915–1944), British Army officer
- Den Dover (born 1938), British politician
- Den Fujita (1926–2004), Japanese businessman, founder of McDonald's Japan
- Den Harrow (born 1962), stage name of Italian fashion model Stefano Zandri
- Den Hegarty (born 1954), Irish rock and roll, doo-wop and a cappella singer living in Britain

== Other uses ==
- Den or denier (unit), a measure of the linear mass density of fibers
- Den, abbreviation for the orchid genus Dendrobium
- DEN, IATA code for Denver International Airport
- DEN, IATA code for the former Stapleton International Airport in Denver, Colorado
- A common abbreviation for the U.S. city of Denver, Colorado and its major professional sports teams:
  - Denver Broncos, the city's National Football League team
  - Denver Nuggets, the city's National Basketball Association team

== See also ==
- The Den (disambiguation)
- DEN (disambiguation)
- Denn (disambiguation)
- Dens (disambiguation)
- Lair (disambiguation)
