= Denn =

Denn may refer to:

- DENN, the NASDAQ ticker symbol for Denny's
- Denn, County Cavan, a parish in County Cavan, Ireland
  - Denn GFC, a Gaelic Athletic Association club in County Cavan, Ireland

== People with the surname ==
- Matthew Denn (born 1966), American lawyer and politician
- Robert Denn, English cricketer

== See also ==
- Den (disambiguation)
- Cavan, Ireland
