= Lyre Abbey =

Former abbey in Eure, France

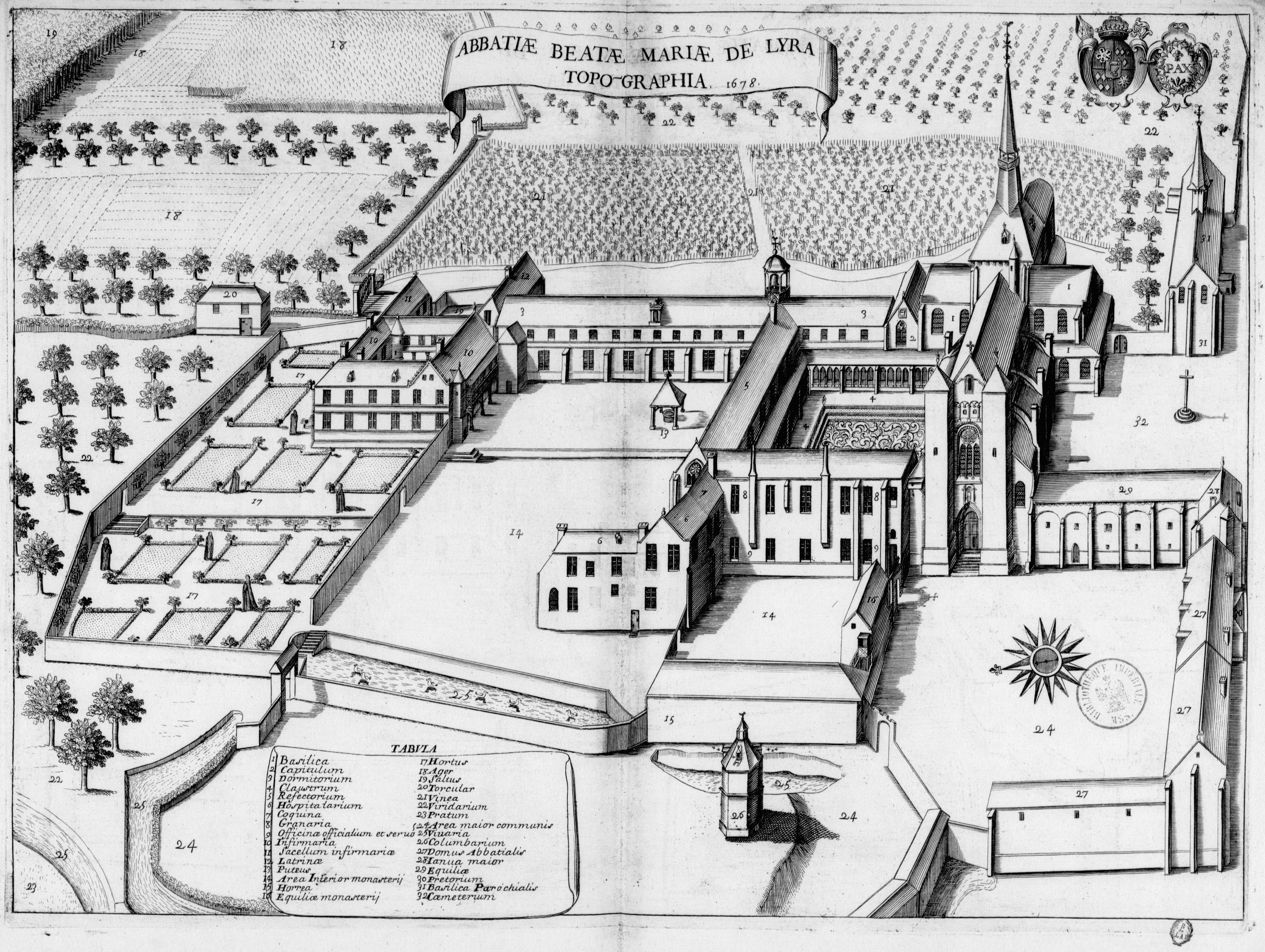
- Lyre Abbey (17th century)
- Interactive map of Lyre Abbey

Monastery information
- Full name: The Abbey of Our Lady of Lyre
- Other name: Abbaye Notre-Dame de Lyre
- Order: by mid-12th century Benedictine
- Established: 1046
- Disestablished: 1790
- Dedication: Virgin Mary
- Diocese: Rouen

People
- Founders: William FitzOsbern, Lord of Breteuil, Earl of Hereford.
- Important associated figures: Robert de Beaumont, Earl of Leicester, Thomas Becket, Cardinals Jean Le Veneur, Hippolyte d'Este, Louis d’Este, Louis of Lorraine (1586-1588), Louis of Lorraine (1593-1598), Jacques Davy Duperron, Armand Gaston Maximilien de Rohan Maurists.

Site
- Location: La Vieille-Lyre, Eure, France
- Coordinates: 48.9183°N 0.75°E
- Visible remains: part of abbot’s residence

Lyre Abbey (French: L'abbaye Notre-Dame de Lyre) was a monastery in Normandy, founded in 1046 at what is now the village of La Vieille-Lyre. From the mid-12th century it was a Benedictine house. It was abolished at the French Revolution and the abbey buildings mostly destroyed.

== History ==
=== Foundation ===
One of the many monasteries that sprang up in Normandy in the 11th century, the abbey of Lyre was founded in 1046, a near contemporary of Bec Abbey and the two great monasteries at Caen, the Abbaye aux Dames and the Abbaye aux Hommes (Saint-Étienne).

William FitzOsbern, (c. 1020-1071), Lord of Breteuil, and his wife Adeliza de Tosny founded the abbey. FitzOsbern is one of the very few proven companions of William the Conqueror known to have fought at the Battle of Hastings in 1066. He was a relative and close counsellor of William, being later made Earl of Hereford. From its founder the abbey received important grants in its immediate vicinity, but also further afield. In the wake of the Norman conquest FitzOsbern became one of the great magnates of early Norman England, acquiring extensive lands there, from which he made generous donations to Lyre Abbey, which emerges in the Domesday Book as one of the Norman abbeys with the greatest landholdings in England.

Throughout the 12th century Lyre continued to receive lands and rents both in England and in Normandy. The principal benefactor in this period was Robert de Beaumont, Earl of Leicester, Count of Meulan, a major figure close to Kings Henry I and Stephen. This was a period when Lyre’s scriptorium was very active, bearing witness to the abbey’s vitality and prestige by the quality of the illuminated manuscripts it produced and which are now conserved in libraries throughout Europe. In the mid-12th century the monks undertook the rebuilding of the abbey church but in 1188 it was destroyed in a fire. The subsequent rebuilding, in 1199, then lasted until the French Revolution.

During the century following the abbey extended by purchase its lands and rents. The visitation carried out in 1269 by Eudes Rigaud, Archbishop of Rouen, records the presence of 37 monks in the monastery, but also 15 more resident in England or in Wales at the Lyre dependencies of Carisbrooke (Isle of Wight), Hinckley (Leicestershire), Livers Ocle (Herefordshire) and Wareham (Dorset) in England and Llangua (Monmouthshire) in Wales.

=== Decline ===
The Order of St Benedict underwent a crisis from the 12th century onwards and the baton passed in some sense to the Cistercian Order and to the new formula of the mendicant orders, in particular the Franciscans and the Dominicans. The donations of the wealthy faithful followed the trend and Lyre Abbey was no exception among existing monasteries in finding itself with reduced donations.

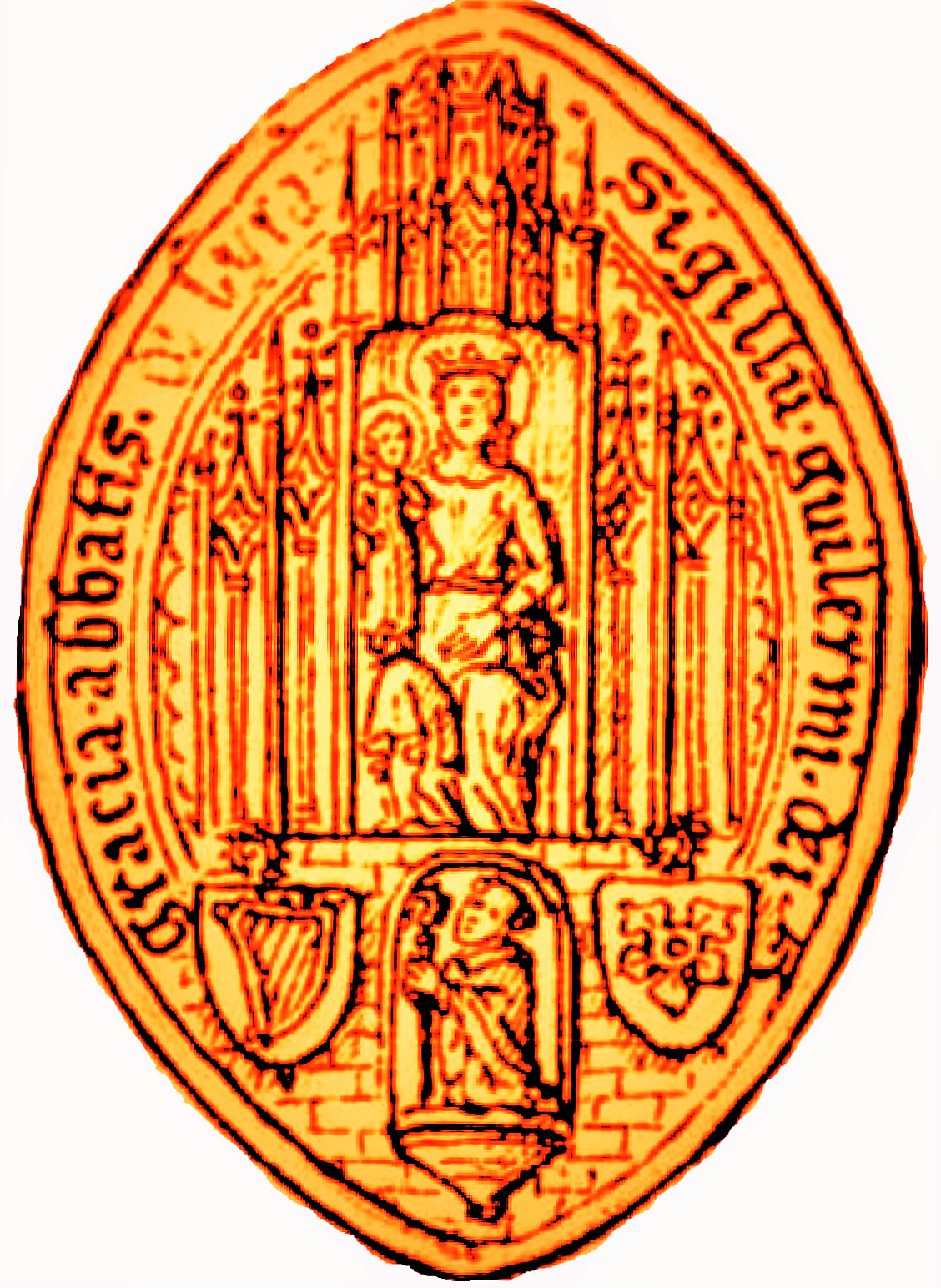
Seal of Abbot Guillaume Le Bas

The Hundred Years' War was an accelerating factor in the decline, the abbey being twice pillaged by the forces of King Charles II of Navarre (Charles the Bad) in about 1359 and again in 1365. In 1419, Normandy came under English rule. When, however, in 1430, a new abbot Guillaume le Bas, a monk of Jumièges Abbey, was imposed on the monastery, the monks resisted on the grounds that he was too favourable to England and in 1440 it took an escort of English troops to enable the abbot to take possession. When in 1449, the forces of Charles VII of France retook the territory, Guillaume le Bas submitted to the new regime but the opposition of his monks continued. The abbot resisted and finally left the abbey only in 1463, when he was appointed Latin Bishop of Avlonari in Greece.

A whole new chapter of woes opened for Lyre as for so many other monasteries with the advent of commendatory abbots. High-ranking outsiders, not rarely laymen, were appointed to be heads of monastic houses as a reward for their service to the crown. Few resided at the monastery, but through an intermediary they syphoned off a substantial proportion of the monastery’s income. In the first half of the 16th century the commendatory abbot of Lyre was the Cardinal, Bishop of Lisieux, who occupied more or less simultaneously the same post at six other abbeys including Mont-Saint-Michel and Bec. While the revenues flowed out to the commendatory abbots, the monastery buildings in many places fell into ruin for want of funds to repair them.

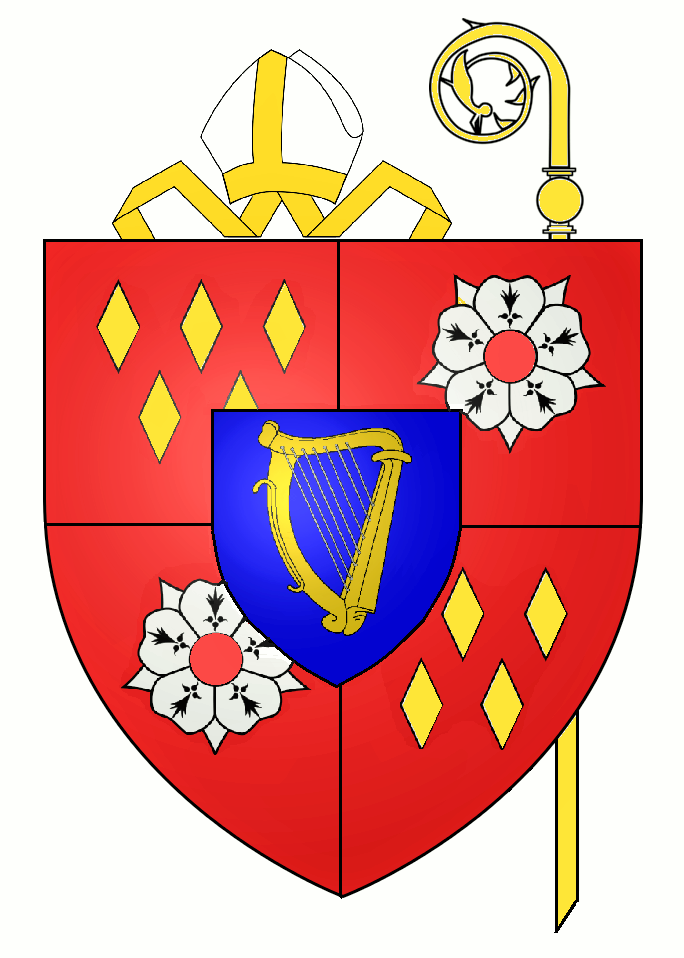
The Lyre Abbey arms after 1646.

In 1646 an important change came about when the then commendatory abbot, the Bishop of Évreux, Jacques Le Noël du Perron brought to the abbey the Maurist reform. The aggregation to the Congregation of Saint-Maur meant at first an influx of more monks to join the existing community. A new and more austere lifestyle was introduced and a dedication to scholarly activities. From the end of the 17th century the Maurists reconstructed practically all the abbey buildings, but the new burst of energy did not succeed in galvanizing recruitment and in 1698 there were only 7 monks.

The arrival of the Maurists did not mean that the appointment of commendatory abbots had ceased and in the 18th century Lyre was in the hands of two prelates of the House of Rohan, both Prince Bishops of Strasbourg.

=== Suppression ===
The end of Lyre Abbey at the time of the French Revolution came in two phases.

Consequent upon the decision taken on 13 February 1790 by the National Assembly to dissolve all religious orders, the ten monks of Lyre were thrown into crisis. Already their relations with the local villagers were tense, exacerbated by the revolutionary propaganda which included them in the hated landowning classes. By nightfall on 16 May several of the abbey’s valuables had already been stolen, though some of the locals accused the monks themselves of being responsible. As the situation evolved, the community, minus the prior and subprior, were in effect prisoners for months in their own house. When finally they were allowed to leave, the abbey as a monastic community ended seven and a half centuries of existence.

In the second phase, the abbey buildings, having been like all similar properties throughout France declared possessions of the state, started to be leased out from September 1790 and were then eventually sold off in lots. The abbey church was made the parish church, but its parlous condition prompted the parishioners to abandon it again for their original church. In November 1797 they were vindicated when the abbey church collapsed in part, and in early 1798 the decision was taken to sell off the rest of the buildings. There was a general demolition; stone and funeral monuments were all carried off and the trees felled. By 1804 an official survey noted that there was no further trace of the abbey, except for part of the abbot’s residence.

== Abbots ==
=== Monastic abbots ===
- Robert du Châlet (c. 1050-), first abbot.
- Erfast
- Bernon
- Ernault or Arnault
- Hildevert or Hildebert
- Gilbert I de Glos
- Guillaume I
- Raoul I
- Hildier (-1147)
- Guillaume II (1148-1166)
- Osbert or Osbern (-1177)
- Geoffroy I (1177-1206)
- Guillaume III de Ferrières (1206-1216)
- Robert de l’Isle (1216-1221)
- Richard of Leicester (1221-1226)
- Jean I d’Almenesches (1226-1241)
- Geoffroy de la Vallée (1241-1246)
- Gilbert de la Haye (1246-1262)
- Robert II de Gauville (1262-1282)
- Raoul II de Romilly (1282-1296)
- Guillaume IV Héduart (1297-1329)
- Hildier II (1330-1331)
- Robert III (1332-1334)
- Guillaume V Tesson (1334-1350)
- Jean II (1350-1362)
- Guillaume VI Leblond (1362-1367)
- Guillaume VII (1367-1374)
- Georges Nizier or Le Mercier (1374-1389)
- Astorge de Beauclerc (1390-1400)
- Etienne du Pré (1400-1414; resigned)
- Simon de Monceaux (1414-1440)
- Guillaume Le Bas (1440-1463; later Latin Bishop of Avlonari)

=== Commendatory abbots before the Maurist Reform ===
- Louis d'Harcourt (1463-1479)
- Pierre III d'Amboise (1479-1481)
- Benoît de Chaumecy or de Chamecy (1484-1500)
- Jean III de Cléry (1500-1512; elected by the monks of Lyre)
- René de Prie (1512-1516; a cardinal, he died at the abbey in 1516.)
- Ambroise Le Veneur de Tillières (1516-1531)
- Jean Le Veneur (1531-1535; a cardinal, and the brother of his predecessor)
- Gabriel Le Veneur de Tillières (1535-1549; great nephew of his predecessor)
- Hippolyte d'Este (1549-1571; a cardinal )
- Louis or Aloyse d’Este (1575-1586; a cardinal)
- Louis of Lorraine (1586-1588; a cardinal).
- Louis of Lorraine (1593-1598; a cardinal)
- Charles of Bourbon (1598-1599; Archbishop of Rouen)
- Jacques Davy Duperron (1599-1618; a cardinal)
- Jean Davy du Perron (1618-1621; brother of his predecessor)

=== Commendatory Abbots from the Maurist Reform ===
- Jacques Le Noël du Perron (1622-1648; died 1649)
- Louis Barbier de La Rivière (1649-1670)
- Jacques Bretel de Grémonville (1670-1686)
- Jean-Jacques Séguier de La Verrière (1688-1689)
- Louis VI de Calvière (1689-1698)
- Armand Gaston Maximilien de Rohan (1698-1713; a cardinal)
- Pierre de Pardaillan de Gondrin (1713-1733)
- Louis Constantin de Rohan (1734-1779)
- François de Narbonne-Lara (1779-1789; last abbot)

== Burials ==
- William of Breteuil

== See also ==
- List of Benedictine monasteries in France

== Reading ==
- Charles Guéry, Histoire de l’abbaye de Lyre, Imprimerie de l’Eure, Évreux, 1917. gallica.bnf.fr
- Laurent Ridel, Nigel Wilkins, Notre-Dame de Lyre : Histoire d'une abbaye disparue, Mont-Saint-Aignan, Presses universitaires de Rouen et du Havre, 2019, (ISBN 979-10-240-0452-5).
