= Laris =

Laris may refer to:

- The plural of Lari (several meanings)
- Laris (moth), synonym of the moth genus Parastenolechia
- Le Laris, part of Saint-Christophe-et-le-Laris, a commune in France
- Laris Fylaktou (also Lakis Fylaktou; born 1964), a Cypriot athlete
- Tom Laris (born 1940), an American athlete

== See also ==
- Larix, a genus of conifers
- Lares (disambiguation)
