= Champignolles =

Champignolles is the name of several communes in France:

- Champignolles, Côte-d'Or
- Champignolles, Eure
