= Parastenolechia argobathra =

Scientific classification
- Kingdom: Animalia
- Phylum: Arthropoda
- Class: Insecta
- Order: Lepidoptera
- Family: Gelechiidae
- Genus: Parastenolechia
- Species: P. argobathra

Binomial name
- Parastenolechia argobathra (Meyrick, 1935)

Synonyms
- Telphusa argobathra Meyrick, 1935; Laris (Origo) argobathra umbrosa Omelko, 1988; Laris argobathra

Species of moth

Parastenolechia argobathra is a moth of the family Gelechiidae. It is found in Korea, Japan, the Russian Far East and China.

The wingspan is 14–15 mm. Adults are similar to Parastenolechia superba.
