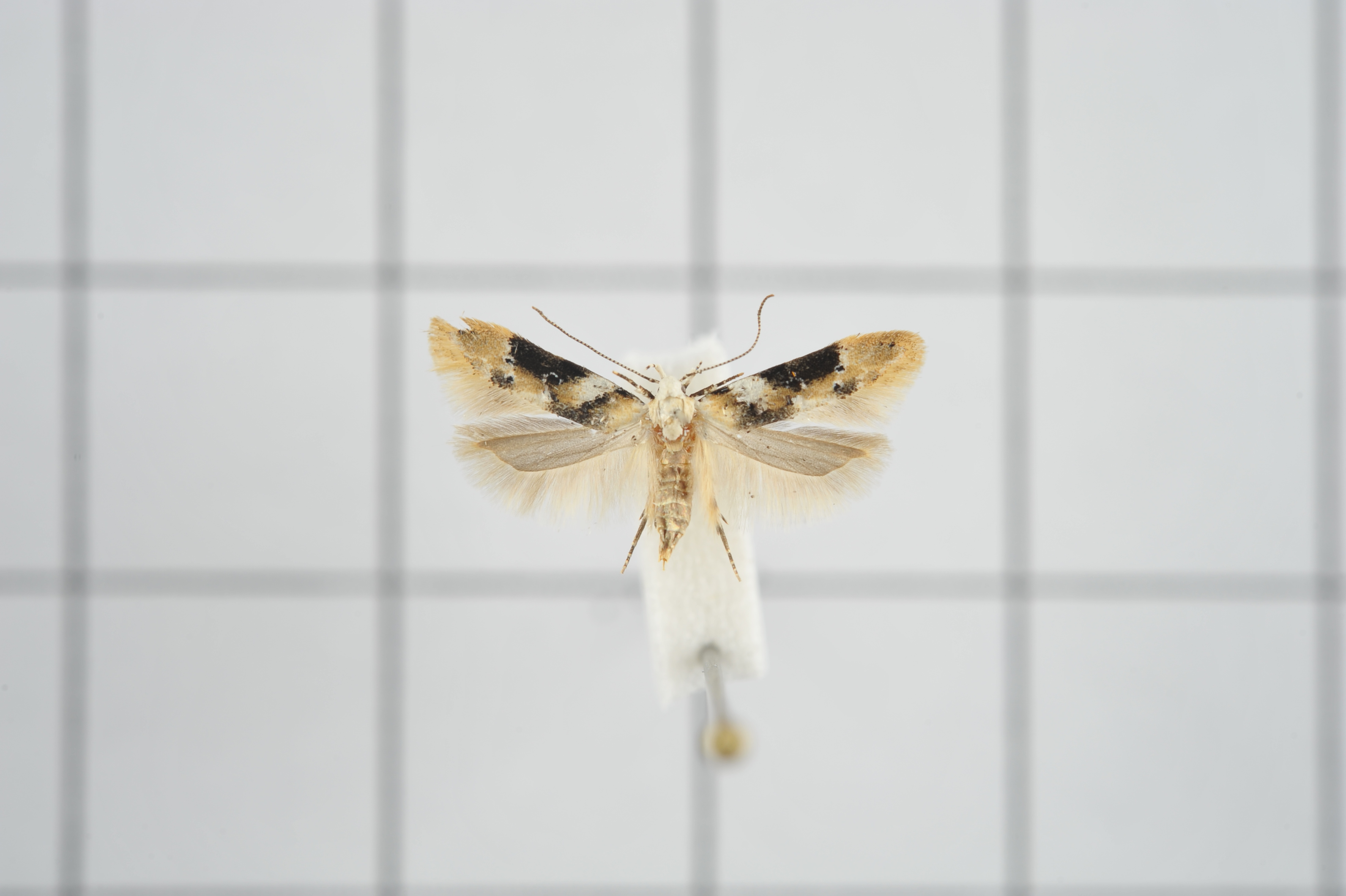

Scientific classification
- Domain: Eukaryota
- Kingdom: Animalia
- Phylum: Arthropoda
- Class: Insecta
- Order: Lepidoptera
- Family: Gelechiidae
- Genus: Parastenolechia
- Species: P. asymmetrica

Binomial name
- Parastenolechia asymmetrica Kanazawa, 1985

= Parastenolechia asymmetrica =

Species of moth

Parastenolechia asymmetrica is a moth of the family Gelechiidae. It is found in Taiwan and Korea.
