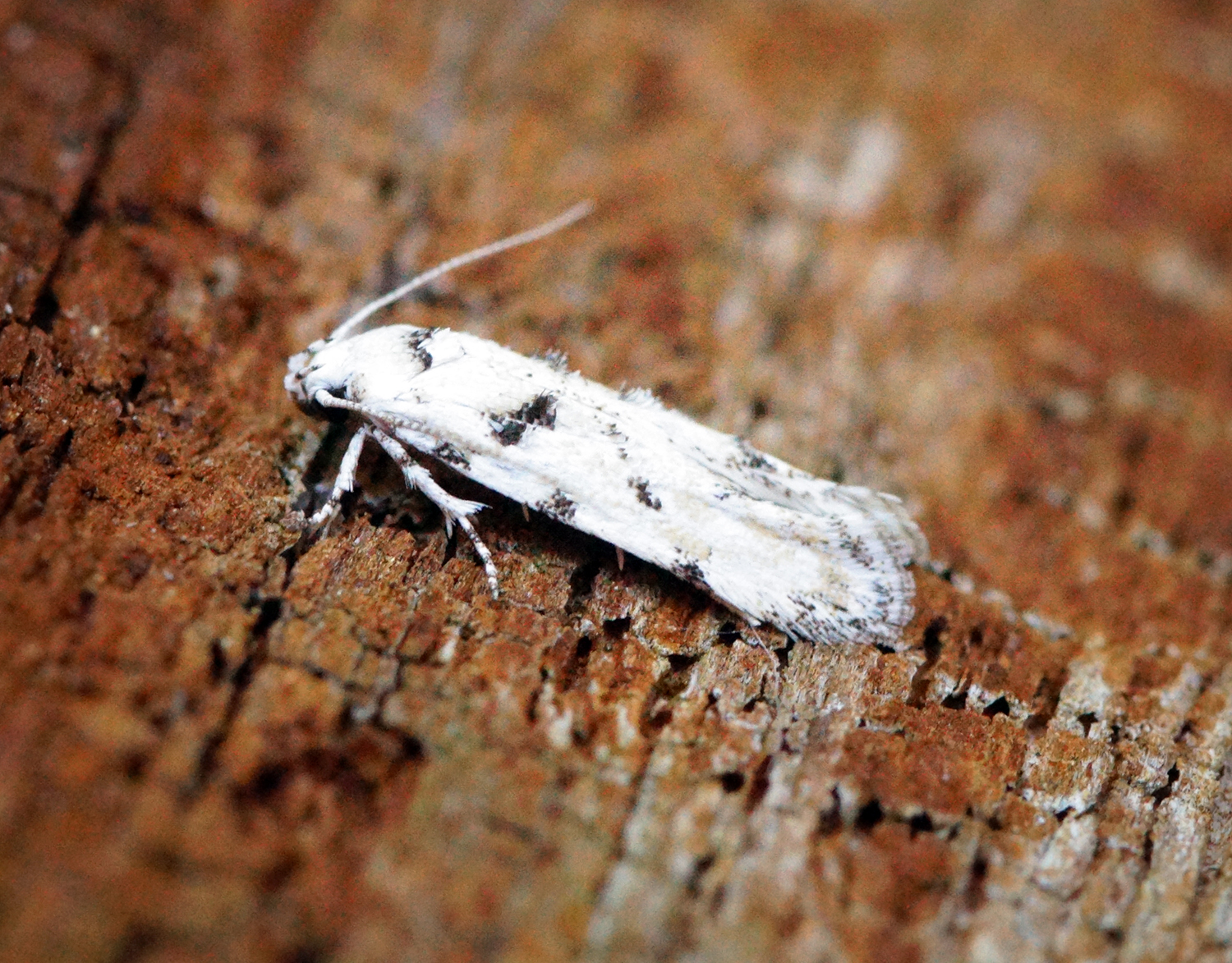
- Parastenolechia nigrinotella

Scientific classification
- Kingdom: Animalia
- Phylum: Arthropoda
- Clade: Pancrustacea
- Class: Insecta
- Order: Lepidoptera
- Family: Gelechiidae
- Genus: Parastenolechia
- Species: P. nigrinotella

Binomial name
- Parastenolechia nigrinotella (Zeller, 1847)

Synonyms
- Gelechia nigrinotella Zeller, 1847; Stenolechia nigrinotella; Gelechia nigralbella Herrich-Schäffer, 1854

= Parastenolechia nigrinotella =

Species of moth

Parastenolechia nigrinotella is a moth of the family Gelechiidae. It is found in Turkey, on Sicily and in Spain, France, Italy, Austria, the Czech Republic, Slovakia, Croatia, Hungary, Romania, Bulgaria, North Macedonia and Greece.

The larvae feed on Quercus pubescens.
