= Pierre Desrey =

French chronicler, historian, genealogist and translator

Pierre Desrey de Troyes
- Born: c. 1450; Troyes, France
- Died: c. 1514
- Other name: Latin: Petro Desrey
- Occupation: Historian
- Known for: Genealogie de Godefroi de Buillon

Pierre Desrey de Troyes (c. 1450–1514) was a French chronicler, historian, genealogist and translator. Relatively little is known of his life, but his work is of value to historians.

== Life and work ==
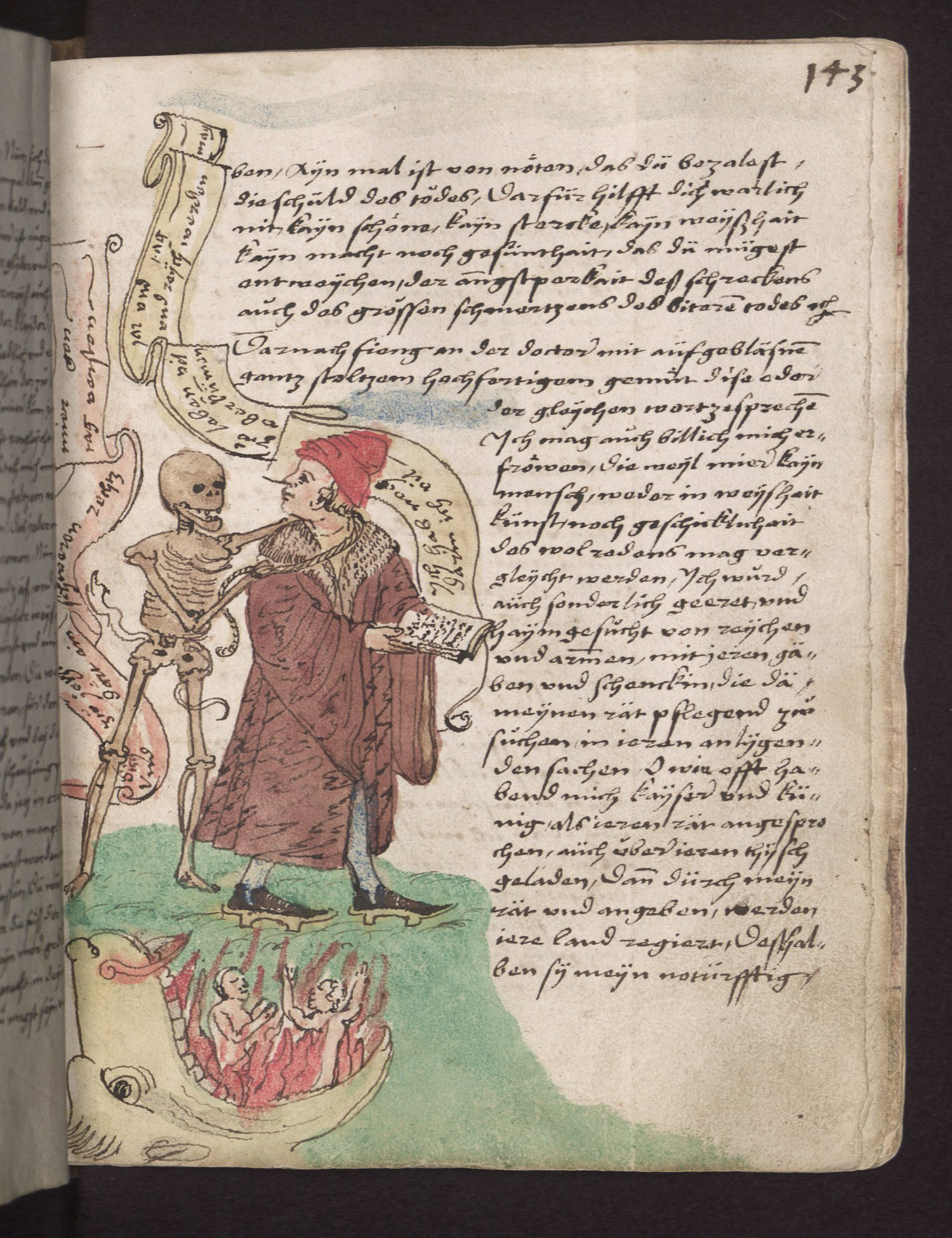
Page from the Vergänglichkeitsbuch of Wilhelm Werner, a translation of the Visio Heremitae by Pierre Desrey

Desrey was born around 1450 and died around 1514. He was a native of Troyes. His motto was said to be Tout par honneur (All in good faith). Little is known of his life, but his work indicates that he was well educated and had broad interests. He was a scholar with deep knowledge of the scriptures, a translator and a compiler of history who drew on various sources. In his continuation of the Chronicles de Enguerran de Monstrelet, which includes the whole reign of Charles VIII of France, he describes himself as a "simple orateur de Troyes en Champagne." Since there is no record of his being a member of the clergy, "orateur" may be taken as meaning "prose writer".

Desrey contributed to the Mystère de la Passion de Troyes, and acted in the plays as a member of the Compagnons de Mystère. According to Théophile Boutiot, Desrey was one of the main actors in 1497, and could be called the principal. That year he represented the eternal Father. The town gave him 100 sous for his expenses and effort. His writings include a Latin version of the Danse Macabre (1490), a translation of Nicholas of Lyra's Les Postilles et Expositions des Epistres et Evangilles Dominacales (1493), a translation of Werner Rolevinck's Fasciculus Temporum entitled Fleurs et Manières des Temps Passées (1495), a compilation La genealogie avecques les gestes et nobles faitz d'armes du trespreux et renommé prince Godeffroy de Boulion (1504), Parement et triumphe des Dames d'Olivier de la Marche (1510) and contributions on Monstrelet (1512) and Gaguin (1514) to the Grandes Chroniques de France.

Desrey is thought to be the author of several poems, and is also thought to be the author of the Troyes Mémoire. This was apparently written in 1492. It is a set of instructions for artists making tapestries for the Church of Saint-Urbain, Troyes, that would depict legends of Saint Urban and Saint Cecilia. They gave a good sense of the details he thought important as an iconographer, but left considerable freedom of expression to the artist.

Item, to begin the representation ... a domestic tabernacle shaped like a noble palace will be portrayed in which glorious St. Urban will be depicted, dressed as a young schoolboy, hands joined, eyes looking up to heaven, kneeling humbly before an altar.

Desrey's Genealogie de Godefroi de Buillon, completed in 1499, survives only in print. It gives a complete history of the Crusades, starting with the birth of the Chevalier au Cygne (Knight of the Swan), the mythical ancestor of Godfrey of Bouillon (1060–1100), and ending after the accession of Philip IV of France (1268–1314). At least six editions are preserved from the 16th century, published between 1504 and 1580.

== Surviving publications ==
=== Author ===
- Pierre Desrey (15 October 1490), Chorea ab eximio Macabro / versibus Alemanicis edita et a Petro Desrey ... nuper emendata (in Latin), Paris: Gui Marchand, for Geoffroy de Marnef – via Rare Book and Special Collections Division at the Library of Congress
- ——; Vincent de Beauvais (1511), La genealogie avecques les gestes et nobles faitz darmes du trespreux et renommé prince Godeffroy de Boulion et de ses chevaleureux frères Baudouin et Eustace (in French), Michel Le Noir
- —— (1580), La genealogie et nobles faitz d'armes du trespreux & renommé prince Godeffroy de Buillon; Aussi le voyage d'outre Mer en la terre saincte, faict par le roy Sainct Loys, & plusieurs autres cronicques (in French), Lyon: François Arnoullet : impr. Basile Bouquet
- ——; Robert Gaguin (8 May 1516), Les Croniques de France (in French), Nicole de La Chesnaye, translation, Paris: Poncet Le Preux
- ——; Robert Gaguin (1514), Les grandes croniques, excellens faits et virtueux gestes des très illustres, très chrestiens, magnanimes et victorieux roys de France (in French), Translation, Nicole de La Chesnaye, Galliot Du Pré, Poncet Le Preux
- ——; Robert Gaguin (1518), La Mer des croniques et mirouer historial de France, jadiz composée en latin par religieuse personne frère Robert Gaguin,... (in French), translated by Nicole de La Chesnaye, Nicolas de La Barre
- ——, Archives curieuses de l'histoire de France... 1re série. - Tome 1er: Relation du voyage du roy Charles VIII pour la conqueste du royaume de Naples (in French), Paris: Beauvais, 1834

=== Translator ===
- Nicholas of Lyra (1492), Les Postilles et Expositions des Évangiles (in French), translated by Pierre Desrey, Paris: Pierre et Guillaume Le Rouge
- Bible: Ensemble des textes sacrés pour les religions juive et chrétienne, écrits par des auteurs différents, à des époques différentes, est traditionnellement divisé en "Ancien" et "Nouveau" Testament par les chrétiens. Le canon hébraïque ne reconnaît que les 39 livres de l'"Ancien" Testament. Le canon catholique reconnaît 45 livres dans l'"Ancien" Testament (en comptant les livres de la version grecque des Septante) et 27 livres dans le "Nouveau" Testament. Le canon protestant reconnaît 39 livres dans l'"Ancien" Testament (comme le canon hébraïque) et 27 pour le "Nouveau" Testament (in French), translated by ——
- Rodrigo Sanchez de Arevalo, Speculum omnium statuum orbis terrarum (in Latin), translated by ——
- Robert Gaguin (1515), Les Croniques de France, execellens esice faictz et vertueux gestes des très chrestiens roys et princes qui ont régné au dict pays, depuis l'exidion de Troye la grande jusques au règne du roy Françoys premier (in French), translated by ——, Galliot Du Pré, Poncet Le Preux
- Grandes postilles et expositions sur les leçons épitres et évangiles de toute l'année nouvellement (in French), translated by ——, 1519
- Werner Rolevinck (1495), Les Fleurs et manières des temps passés et des faitz merveilleux de Dieu tant en l'Ancien Testament comme ou Nouveau et des premiers seigneurs, princes et gouverneurs temporelz en cestuy monde, de leurs gestez et definement jusques au présent (in Latin), translated by ——, Genève: L. M. Cruse

== Sources ==
- Bibolet, Jean-Claude (1987), Le "Mystère de la Passion" de Troyes: mistere de la Passion Nostre Seigneur, Troyes XVe siècle, Librairie Droz, ISBN 978-2-600-04640-4
- Dacier, Bon-Joseph (1867), "The Life of Monstrelet with an Essay on his Chronicles", The Chronicles of Enguerrand de Monstrelet: Containing an Account of the Cruel Civil Wars Between the Houses of Orleans and Burgundy; of the Possession of Paris and Normandy by the English; Their Expulsion Thence; and of Other Memorable Events that Happened N the Kingdom of France, as Well as in Other Countries ... Beginning at the Year MCCCC, where that of Sir John Froissart Finishes, and Ending at the Year MCCCCLXVII, and Continued by Others to the Year MDXVI., G. Routledge and sons
- Kane, Tina (2010), The Troyes Memoire: The Making of a Medieval Tapestry, Boydell & Brewer, ISBN 978-1-84383-570-7
- Pastan, Elizabeth Carson; White, Stephen D.; Gilbert, Kate (2014), The Bayeux Tapestry and Its Contexts: A Reassessment, Boydell & Brewer Ltd, ISBN 978-1-84383-941-5
- Weill, Isabelle; Suard, François. "Genealogie de Godefroi de Buillon de Pierre Desrey" (in French). Università degli Studi di Milano. Archived from the original on 2016-03-04.
