= Hinckley Priory =

Monastery in Hinckley, Leicestershire, England

- Location within Leicestershire
- Interactive map of Hinckley Priory

Monastery information
- Order: Benedictine
- Established: before 1173
- Disestablished: c.1414
- Mother house: Lyre Abbey (Abbaye Notre-Dame de Lyre), La Vieille-Lyre, Normandy, France
- Diocese: Diocese of Lincoln

Site
- Location: Hinckley, Leicestershire, England
- Coordinates: 52.540254°N 1.371627°W
- Grid reference: SP42719378

Hinckley Priory was a small medieval monastic house in the town of Hinckley, Leicestershire, England.

== History ==
Hinckley Priory was founded as a small alien house: one that owes allegiance to a foreign mother house. In Hinckley's case, this mother house was Lyre Abbey (Abbaye Notre-Dame de Lyre), in La Vieille-Lyre, Normandy, France. The exact year of foundation is unknown, but it was before 1173.

The priory was only small, with only two monks and the prior recorded in 1220. However, the priory played an important role as many of its priors served as Lyre Abbey's Papal Judge Delegates and as Proctors General in England and Wales.

The 15th-century wars between England and France brought trouble for the priory. As an alien house with allegiance to a French mother house, it was vulnerable. In March 1399 Hinckley was removed from the control of Lyre Abbey and granted to the Carthusian monks of Mount Grace Priory in North Yorkshire, for the duration of the wars. A truce with France meant the priory was returned in January 1400. A return to hostilities changed this again. In 1409 Hinckley priory's revenue was granted to Queen Joan (wife of King Henry IV) for her lifetime.

The priory was finally dissolved around 1414, with its property transferred again to Mount Grace Priory, and a pension awarded to Queen Joan.

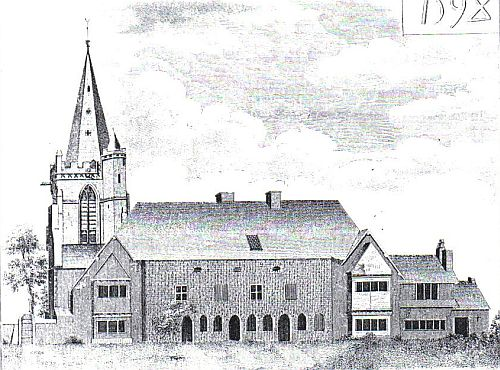
Priory House C.1780. The remains of the prior's residence were extended and converted into a domestic house. The tower of Hinckley parish church is also visible.

=== Priors of Hinckley Priory ===
A list of the known Priors of Hinckley Priory:

- Richard, occurs between 1209 and 1211.
- Richard de Capella, admitted as administrator 1224–5. Resigned 1230–1.
- John de Capella, presented 1230–1, resigned 1233–4.
- Richard de Paceio, presented 1233–4, resigned 1236–7.
- Peter Lumbardus, presented 1236–7, resigned 1244–5.
- William de Aquila, presented 1244–5, resigned 1246–7.
- Hugh of Winchester, presented 1246–7. Gilbert, died 1265.
- Adam de Trungey, presented 1265, resigned 1268.
- Richard de Audreia, presented 1268, resigned 1271.
- Nicholas Bynet, presented 1271.
- William de Arena, resigned 1289.
- Hervey de Alneto, presented 1289.
- Reyner de Sarieta, died 1310.
- Matthew de Puteio, presented 1310.
- Michael, resigned 1333.
- Nicholas de Gaynario, presented 1333.
- John Pepyn, occurs 1342 and December 1347.
- John Morelli, occurs 1348, died 1367.
- John de Ponte, appointed 1367, resigned 1368.
- Ralph de Gorin, presented 1368, died 1375.
- Michael Aufri, presented 1375, occurs 1404.

== Remains ==
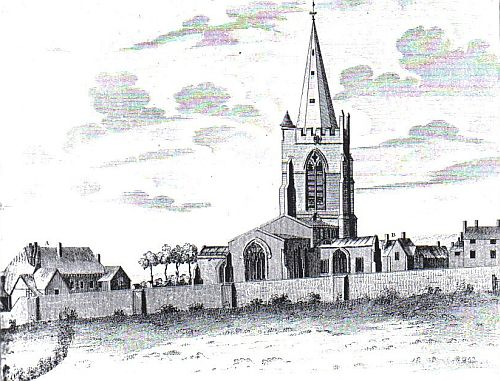
The former prior's residence to the left of Hinckley Parish Church

In 1543 King Henry VIII granted the former priory's land to the Dean and Chapter of Westminster Abbey. The former prior's residence was extended and converted into a domestic house known as "The Priory House" or "Hall House". Wings were added to the main block of the house in the later 16th century. The house was, however, demolished in 1827.

The priory was thought to have been located on the site now occupied by the Parish Hall, however this could not previously be confirmed. Vicar Brian Davies asked the Hinckley Field Walking Group, in 2004/2005, to dig test pits and try to locate any buried remains of the priory. The excavations discovered the remains of the priory: they were to the south of the present church.

Not all of the priory has been excavated. In 2007 Lockett and Wallis published a "Report on the Archaeological Excavation of the Priory Site", recording the extent of current excavations.
