= DEN =

DEN may refer to:

- The IOC and FIFA country code for Denmark
- Denbighshire (historic), traditional county in Wales, Chapman code
- Denver, the capital of and largest city in the U.S. state of Colorado
  - Denver International Airport's IATA code
  - Stapleton International Airport's former IATA code
  - Denver Union Station's Amtrak station code
  - Denver Broncos, the city's National Football League team
  - Denver Nuggets, the city's National Basketball Association team
- Dennis railway station, Melbourne
- Digital Entertainment Network
- Diethylnitrosamine
- Denormal number

== See also ==
- Den (disambiguation)
