= Parastenolechia acclivis =

Scientific classification
- Kingdom: Animalia
- Phylum: Arthropoda
- Clade: Pancrustacea
- Class: Insecta
- Order: Lepidoptera
- Family: Gelechiidae
- Genus: Parastenolechia
- Species: P. acclivis

Binomial name
- Parastenolechia acclivis (Omelko, 1988)

Synonyms
- Tutor acclivis Omelko, 1988

Species of moth

Parastenolechia acclivis is a moth of the family Gelechiidae. It is found in northern Vietnam.
