= Lares (disambiguation) =

The Lares are guardian deities in ancient Roman mythology.

Lares or LARES may also refer to:

== Places ==
- Lares, Africa, a city of Roman Africa and medieval Ifriqiya, at modern Henchir Lorbeus, Tunisia
- Lares, Puerto Rico, a town
  - Lares barrio-pueblo, a barrio and the administrative center of the town
  - Lares, Lares, Puerto Rico, a barrio in the town
- Lares District, Calca, Cusco, Peru

== People ==
- Ismael Lares (fl. early 20th century), Mexican general in the Cristero War
- Osmo Lares (1926–2025), Finnish diplomat
- Shelly Lares (born 1971), American singer-songwriter
- Teodosio Lares (1806–1870), Mexican lawyer and politician

== Acronyms ==
- LARES, an electroacoustic enhancement system
- LARES (satellite), a scientific satellite launched by the Italian Space Agency
- TAROM, formerly LARES, the flag-carrier airline of Romania

== See also ==
- Larrés, a locality in Aragon, Spain
- Lare (disambiguation)
- Laris (disambiguation)
