= Parastenolechia albicapitella =

Scientific classification
- Domain: Eukaryota
- Kingdom: Animalia
- Phylum: Arthropoda
- Class: Insecta
- Order: Lepidoptera
- Family: Gelechiidae
- Genus: Parastenolechia
- Species: P. albicapitella

Binomial name
- Parastenolechia albicapitella Park, 2000

Species of moth

Parastenolechia albicapitella is a moth of the family Gelechiidae. It is found in Korea.

The wingspan is 10.5–11.5 mm.

== Etymology ==
The species name refers to the shiny whitish head and is derived from Latin albus (meaning white) and capitis (meaning head).
