= John Duckett =

English Catholic priest and martyr

Blessed John Duckett
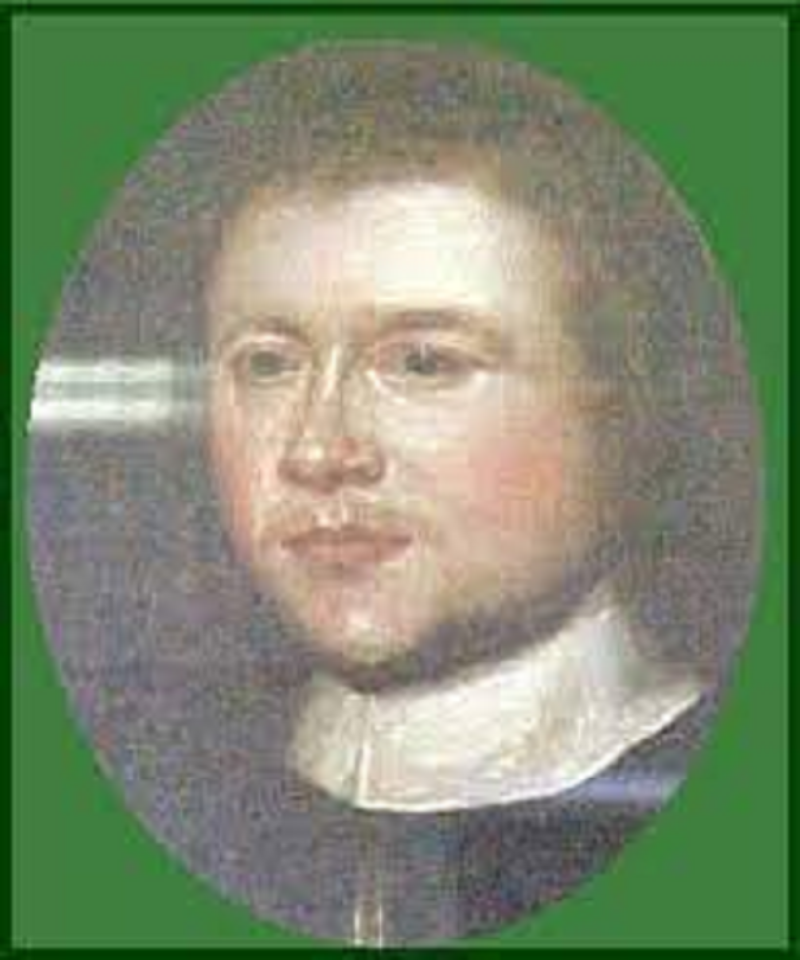
- Born: 1613, Sedbergh, Yorkshire, England
- Died: 7 September 1644 (aged 30 - 31), Tyburn, Middlesex, England
- Venerated in: Catholic Church
- Beatified: 15 December 1929, by Pope Pius XI
- Feast: 7 September

John Duckett (1613 – 7 September 1644) was an English Catholic priest and martyr.

== Life ==
John Duckett was born at Underwinder, in the parish of Sedbergh, in Yorkshire, in 1613, the son of James and Francis Duckett. He was a relative of James Duckett who had been executed at Tyburn on 19 April 1601 for printing Catholic books.

He was baptized on 24 February 1614 and educated at Sedbergh School. At the age of seventeen, he entered the English College, Douai; he was ordained a priest by the Archbishop of Cambrai in 1639 and was then sent to study for three years at the College of Arras in Paris.

After Paris it came time to embark on the English mission, but on his way he spent two months in retreat under the direction of his uncle, John Duckett, prior of the Charterhouse at Nieupoort.

He arrived at Newcastle upon Tyne around Christmas 1643. Duckett worked largely in the North and laboured for about a year in Durham. It was in the time of the Civil War and he was arrested by Roundhead soldiers only a few months later, on 2 July 1644, at Redgate Head, Wolsingham, County Durham, while on his way to baptize two children. Taken to Sunderland, he was examined by a Parliamentary Committee of sequestrators and placed in irons. He admitted he was a priest and so was taken to London with the Jesuit Ralph Corby, arrested about the same time near Newcastle-on-Tyne. They were both confined in Newgate, where they were the cause of crowds of Catholics gathering. On these and on others who encountered them they made an impression by their cheerfulness and sanctity. He was brought to trial on 4 September and given the inevitable sentence of hanging, drawing and quartering. Corby was offered a reprieve, but deferred in favour of the younger Duckett, who refused to walk away and leave his friend. Both were executed at Tyburn in London on 7 September 1644.

== Legacy ==
Ducket was declared Blessed by Pope Pius XI on 15 December 1929, along with Corby.

Blessed John Duckett R.C Primary School is in Bishop Auckland, Durham.

John Duckett’s Cross is a memorial, erected in 1899 through the efforts of Rev. Mother Mary Clare, of St Anne’s Convent of Mercy, Wolsingham, marking the spot where Duckett was arrested.

== See also ==
- Catholic Church in the United Kingdom
- Douai Martyrs

== Sources ==
- Godfrey Anstruther, Seminary Priests, Mayhew-McCrimmond, Great Wakering, vol. 2, 1975, pp. 90, 232.
