= Dens =

Dens may refer to:

- Den (disambiguation)
- Dens, on the axis vertebra, also known as odontoid process or odontoid peg
- Tooth
