= Parastenolechia suriensis =

Scientific classification
- Kingdom: Animalia
- Phylum: Arthropoda
- Class: Insecta
- Order: Lepidoptera
- Family: Gelechiidae
- Genus: Parastenolechia
- Species: P. suriensis

Binomial name
- Parastenolechia suriensis Park & Ponomarenko, 2006

Species of moth

Parastenolechia suriensis is a moth of the family Gelechiidae. It is found in southern and central Korea.

The wingspan is 13–16 mm.

== Etymology ==
The species name is derived from suri, the type localion.
