= Parastenolechia gracilis =

Scientific classification
- Kingdom: Animalia
- Phylum: Arthropoda
- Class: Insecta
- Order: Lepidoptera
- Family: Gelechiidae
- Genus: Parastenolechia
- Species: P. gracilis

Binomial name
- Parastenolechia gracilis Kanazawa, 1991

Species of moth

Parastenolechia gracilis is a moth of the family Gelechiidae. It is found in Taiwan.
