= Theodore Augustine Mann =

English naturalist, historian and Carthusian monk

Theodore Augustine Mann, known as the Abbé Mann (22 June 1735–23 February 1809), was an English naturalist and historian, and a Carthusian monk.

== Education ==
Mann was born in Yorkshire. Little is known of his education except that he seems to have imbibed deistic ideas in his youth. He left England about 1754 and went to Paris. Here the study of Bossuet's Discours sur l'histoire universelle exerted a profound influence upon him, and in 1756 he was received into the Catholic Church by the Archbishop of Paris.

== Religious and literary life ==
Upon the outbreak of the war between France and England in the same year, he went to Spain, where he enlisted in a regiment of dragoons, and afterwards became a student at the military academy of Barcelona. He soon abandoned, however, the idea of a military career, and went to Belgium, where he entered the Carthusian monastery at Nieuwpoort, at that time the sole English house of the order. After his profession his leisure was devoted to scientific study, and his memoir Théorie des causes physiques des mouvements des corps célestes d'après les principes de Newton, won for him membership in the Imperial Academy of Brussels. He became prior of his monastery in 1764, but left the order thirteen years later, after having obtained a Bull of secularization and also the privilege of possessing a benefice.

== Studies ==
He took up his residence at Brussels and received a prebend in the Chapter of Notre-Dame de Courtrai. In 1787 he was chosen perpetual secretary of the Brussels Academy, and carried on numerous meteorological observations under its auspices. The invasion of the French in 1794 forced him to leave Belgium, and, after travelling in Germany and England, he finally settled at Prague, where he continued his literary labours until his death in 1809.

Mann was a laborious student and a versatile writer. He is said to have refused the Bishopric of Antwerp offered him by Emperor Joseph II, rather than abandon his favourite studies.

He was elected a Fellow of the Royal Society in 1788.

== Works ==
His principal literary works, conspicuous for their erudition, were:

- Mémoire et lettres sur l'étude de la langue grecque (Brussels, 1781);
- Mémoire sur la conservation et le commerce des grains (Mechlin, 1764);
- Abrégé de l'histoire ecclesiastique, civile, et naturelle de la ville de Bruxelles et de ses environs (Brussels, 1785), in collaboration with Johannes Franciscus Foppens;
- Histoire du règne de Marie Thérèse (Brussels, 1781; 2nd ed., 1786);
- Recueil de mémoires sur les grandes gelées et leurs effets (Ghent, 1792);
- Principes métaphysiques des êtres et des connaissances (Vienna, 1807), and numerous papers in the Mémoires of the Brussels Academy.

He was also the translator of an English work, which was published under the title Dictionnaire des Jardiniers et des Cultivateurs (Brussels, 1786–9).

== Sources ==
- ODNB: Theodore Augustine Mann
