= The Den (disambiguation) =

The Den, formerly known as The New Den, is the current home of Millwall F.C. in Bermondsey, London.

The Den may also refer to:

- The Old Den, formerly known as The Den, once the home of Millwall FC, was located in New Cross, London
- Lamport Stadium, rugby league stadium in Toronto, Canada, known as The Den when hosting Toronto Wolfpack RLFC home games
- The Den, North Ayrshire, hamlet in Scotland, also known as Barkip
- The Den (TV programme), Irish children's television strand
- The Den (2013 film), a 2013 horror film starring Melanie Papalia

== See also ==
- Den (disambiguation)
