= Parastenolechia formosana =

Scientific classification
- Domain: Eukaryota
- Kingdom: Animalia
- Phylum: Arthropoda
- Class: Insecta
- Order: Lepidoptera
- Family: Gelechiidae
- Genus: Parastenolechia
- Species: P. formosana

Binomial name
- Parastenolechia formosana Kanazawa, 1991

Species of moth

Parastenolechia formosana is a moth of the family Gelechiidae. It is found in Taiwan.
