= Larré =

Larré or Larre may refer to:

== People ==
- Enrique Larre (1933–2024), Chilean politician
- Erik Sture Larre (1914–2014), Norwegian lawyer, resistance member, sports official and environmentalist
- Juan Andrés Larre (1967–2026), Uruguayan footballer
- Lucien Larré (1932–2026), Canadian Roman Catholic priest and psychologist
- Tydeo Larre Borges (1893–1984), Uruguayan army officer and aviator

== Places in France ==
- Larré, Morbihan, in Brittany
- Larré, Orne, in Lower Normandy

== See also ==
- Larrés, a locality in Spain
