= Parastenolechia superba =

Scientific classification
- Domain: Eukaryota
- Kingdom: Animalia
- Phylum: Arthropoda
- Class: Insecta
- Order: Lepidoptera
- Family: Gelechiidae
- Genus: Parastenolechia
- Species: P. superba

Binomial name
- Parastenolechia superba (Omelko, 1988)

Synonyms
- Laris (Origo) superba Omelko, 1988

Species of moth

Parastenolechia superba is a moth of the family Gelechiidae. It is found in Korea and the Russian Far East.

The wingspan is about 14 mm. Adults are nearly identical to Parastenolechia issikiella.

The larvae feed on the young shoots of Quercus mongolicae.
