= René de Prie =

French Roman Catholic bishop and cardinal

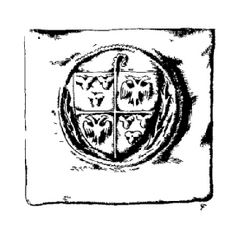
Seal of René de Prie

René de Prie (1451–1519) was a French Roman Catholic bishop and cardinal.

== Biography ==
René de Prie was born in Touraine in 1451, the son of Antoine de Prie, baron of Buzançais, and Madeleine d'Amboise. He was a cousin of Cardinal Georges d'Amboise.

Through the influence of his cousin the cardinal, Prie became grand-archdeacon of Bourges; archdeacon of Blois; and dean of the Église Saint-Hilaire-le-Grand. He was also a protonotary apostolic.

On 3 August 1498 he was elected Bishop of Bayeux. He entered his see on 25 March 1499 and occupied it until 24 November 1516.

On 8 January 1499, in Nantes, he signed the marriage contract of Louis XII of France and Anne of Brittany. Louis XII then sent him to Étaples to conclude a treaty with Henry VII of England. He became prior of Layrac. During the Italian War of 1499–1504, he accompanied Louis XII to Genoa. On 20 May 1506 the king gave him the title of baron of Précigné and the abbey of Déols.

Pope Julius II made him a cardinal priest in the consistory of 17 May 1507. He received the titular church of Santa Lucia in Septisolio on 17 May 1507. Cardinal Georges d'Amboise, who was then the papal legate to France, presented him with the red hat on 5 August 1507 in the church of the Dominicans in Lyon.

In 1509, the king of France sent him to Rome as his ambassador to the Holy See. He opted for the titular church of San Vitale on 7 November 1509. Following the arrest of Cardinal François Guillaume de Castelnau-Clermont-Ludève on 29 June 1510, Cardinal de Prie left Rome along with other prelates loyal to Louis XII. During the War of the League of Cambrai, he accompanied Louis XII in his expedition against Milan in October 1510, in direct violation of the pope's orders. On 17 March 1511 he opted for the titular church of Santa Sabina. Pope Julius II deposed him as a cardinal on 24 October 1511 and excommunicated him for his role in organizing a schismatic council at Pisa that opened on 1 November 1511. On 10 January 1512 he wrote to the University of Paris in opposition to writings by Thomas Cajetan attacking Jean Gerson.

Because of his deposition as a cardinal, he was unable to participate in the papal conclave of 1513 that elected Pope Leo X. On 20 January 1514 he presided at the funeral of Anne of Brittany in the Basilica of St Denis. He soon reconciled with the new pope, being pardoned and reinstated on 24 April 1514.

On 21 August 1514 he became prior of the Benedictine monastery at Malpas. From 18 August 1514 to 5 December 1516 he was the Bishop of Limoges. On 14 September 1514 he presided at the marriage of Louis XII of France to Mary Tudor.

He died at Lyre Abbey near Évreux on 9 September 1519. He is buried in the Cistercian abbey of Notre-Dame de la Prée, Bourges.
