= Parastenolechia =

Scientific classification
- Kingdom: Animalia
- Phylum: Arthropoda
- Clade: Pancrustacea
- Class: Insecta
- Order: Lepidoptera
- Family: Gelechiidae
- Subfamily: Gelechiinae
- Tribe: Litini
- Genus: Parastenolechia; Kanazawa, 1985

Synonyms
- Laris Omelko, 1988; Origo Omelko, 1988; Tutor Omelko, 1988

Genus of moths

Parastenolechia is a genus of moths in the family Gelechiidae.

== Species ==
- Parastenolechia acclivis (Omelko, 1988)
- Parastenolechia albicapitella Park, 2000
- Parastenolechia argobathra (Meyrick, 1935)
- Parastenolechia asymmetrica Kanazawa, 1985
- Parastenolechia claustrifera (Meyrick, 1935)
- Parastenolechia collucata (Omelko, 1988)
- Parastenolechia formosana Kanazawa, 1991
- Parastenolechia gracilis Kanazawa, 1991
- Parastenolechia issikiella (Okada, 1961)
- Parastenolechia nigrinotella (Zeller, 1847)
- Parastenolechia superba (Omelko, 1988)
- Parastenolechia suriensis Park & Ponomarenko, 2006
