= Parastenolechia issikiella =

Scientific classification
- Domain: Eukaryota
- Kingdom: Animalia
- Phylum: Arthropoda
- Class: Insecta
- Order: Lepidoptera
- Family: Gelechiidae
- Genus: Parastenolechia
- Species: P. issikiella

Binomial name
- Parastenolechia issikiella (Okada, 1961)

Synonyms
- Stenolechia issikiella Okada, 1961; Telphusa cornisignella Moriuti, 1977

Species of moth

Parastenolechia issikiella is a moth of the family Gelechiidae. It is found in Japan and Korea.

The wingspan is 11–14 mm.
