= Carisbrooke Priory =

Two priories on the Isle of Wight, England

Coordinates: 50.686°N 1.308°W

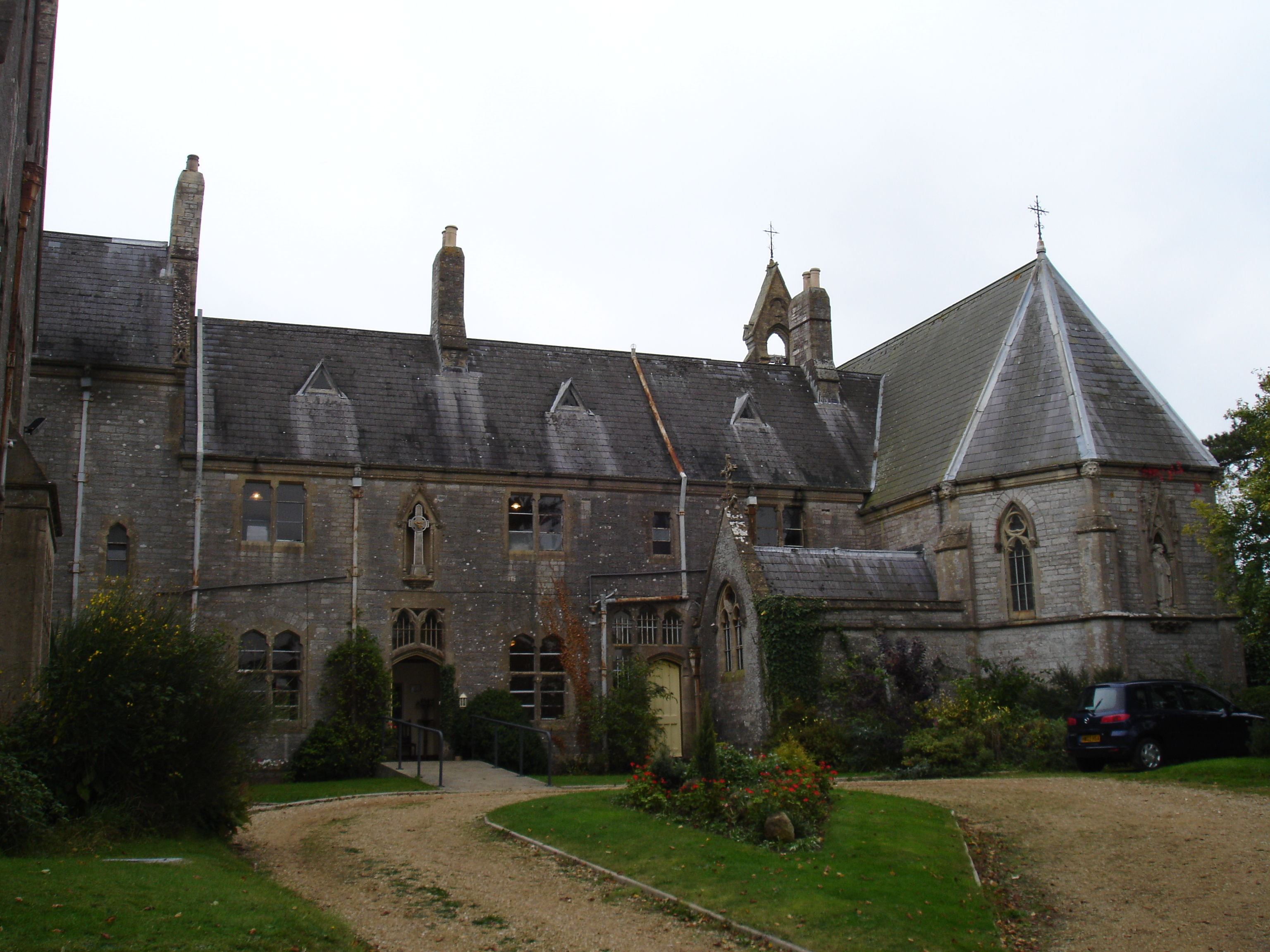
Carisbrooke Priory

Carisbrooke Priory was an alien priory, a dependency of Lyre Abbey in Normandy, France. The priory was situated on rising ground on the outskirts of Carisbrooke close to Newport on the Isle of Wight. This priory was dissolved in around 1415.

A second Carisbrooke Priory was created in 1993, when St. Dominic's Priory, which had been established as a community of Dominican nuns in 1865–66 (on a different site from the earlier priory) was so renamed.

== History ==
=== Benedictine monks ===
In 1046, William FitzOsbern, kinsman of William the Conqueror, founded Lyre Abbey in Normandy. When William became King of England, FitzOsbern was given charge of the Isle of Wight, and took up residence in Carisbrooke Castle. In the wake of the Norman conquest, FitzObern became one of the great magnates of early Norman England, acquiring extensive lands there, from which he made generous donations to Lyre Abbey. The church of Carisbrooke, and other property, had been granted to the abbey of Lyre, probably by William Fitz Osberne, Earl of Hereford, around 1067. By the mid-12th century, Lyre Abbey had adopted the Benedictine rule.

Around 1100, Henry I of England made Richard de Redvers, also from Normandy, Lord of the Isle of Wight. His son, Baldwin de Redvers, Earl of Devon and Lord of the Isle of Wight, gave to the Abbey of Lyre all the churches, tithes, lands, rents and benefits that he held throughout the island. Henry II's confirmation charter to Lyre Abbey specifies its possessions throughout England. The priory of Carisbrooke was founded in 1156 by Baldwin de Redvers, to collect the dues in the Isle of Wight of the parent house in Normandy. The monks of Carisbrooke served the chapels of Newport and Northwood

In 1295, when King Edward I of England was at war with France, Carisbrooke was among the alien priories impounded by the Crown. This happened again during the reign of Edward III and the priory, being in the king's hands, was granted by Richard II to the Carthusian Mount Grace Priory in Yorkshire. It was restored to Prior Thomas Val Oseul by Henry IV on condition of the "apport" or customary tribute to Lyre being paid instead to the Crown, and future appointments of monks being filled by Englishmen, but was seized again by Henry V and bestowed on his new charterhouse at Sheen, and the monks dispersed.

=== Dominican nuns ===
Elizabeth Burrell, daughter of Peter Burrell, 1st Lord Gwydwyr, and Lady Priscilla Bertie, suo jure Baroness Willoughby de Eresby, was married to John FitzGibbon, 2nd Earl of Clare, Lord Lieutenant of the City of Limerick. They lived apart, Lady Clare taking up residence at Ryde on the Isle of Wight. In 1865 she invited the nuns of the Dominican Order at Stonyhurst to move to the Isle of Wight. She provided £12,000 towards the cost of a new priory, St. Dominic's Priory, at Carisbrooke on a different site to the pre-Reformation priory.

In the mid-17th century, Philip Howard, a Dominican friar and son of Henry Howard, 15th Earl of Arundel, founded a convent of nuns of the Second Order of Saint Dominic at Vilvoorde in Flanders. This community later relocated to Carisbrooke.
