= Den (film) =

2001 film by Greg Arce

- Promotional poster
- Directed by: Greg Arce
- Written by: Greg Arce
- Produced by: Greg Arce
- Starring: Greg Arce; Stephanie Rettig; Lee Schall; Dana J. Ryan; Sabrina O'Neil
- Cinematography: Jacky Hay
- Edited by: Tomer Almagor; Rom Lipschitz
- Production company: Clown Tears Productions
- Distributed by: Wonderphil Productions; Force Entertainment
- Release date: 15 June 2001
- Running time: 120 minutes
- Countries: United States; Australia
- Language: English

Den (marketed as DeN) is a 2001 independent drama horror film written and directed by Greg Arce. The film was released on 15 June 2001 in Culver City, California. In 2009, Arce announced that he was looking into potential legal actions against the producers of the 2004 film Saw, as Arce alleges that Saw has at least similarities to his movie. Film critics and bloggers have noticed the similarities as well.

Although shot in Jerome, Arizona, Den only saw dvd release in Australia as briefly mentioned in Peter Shelley's Australian Horror Films, 1973-2010.

== Plot ==
The film begins with a bearded man waking up in his house and going through his morning routine. He touches his cross necklace, grabs a stack of chewing gum, looks into the mirror and announces merrily "It's showtime!". Den (although his name is never spoken) cruises the city on a skateboard and captures four future victims: a psychotherapist and his wife - Steven and Lolita Brewster; Cassandra - a militant atheist, who moonlights as a prostitute; and Milton Page - a respiratory therapist who once longed to be a nun. Den places his victims in a large abandoned theater. He chains the captives to the walls and doles out meager supplies that will keep them alive. Den is truthful to the group: He admits he is a serial killer and that they are on his "list of people to do." But he wants something... conversation. Through the course of nine days, he starts daily arguments and debates with the group. As the days pass on it is revealed that the group is not only tied by chains, but by personal secrets. Milton reveals that her passion to be a nun was squelched when she realized she had sexual attractions towards women. She also confesses to having an affair with a married woman. Steven's darker side comes out early on when his racial and biased belief system is heard. He has also been a disloyal spouse by seeing hookers, which is a surprise to Lolita, but not to Cassandra. Lolita has her own skeleton she wishes to keep in the closet, but Den opens the door when it is disclosed that she has also had an affair... with Milton. And when Cassandra admits to being an atheist, this shocks Den more than her work as a prostitute.

It is revealed that Den is storing them under a church where he works as a priest. Den uses the captive's secrets to turn one against the other. But Cassandra takes all the physical and mental abuse and throws it back at Den with all the strength and stamina she can muster.

As the final day approaches the body count rises: Den has cut off Lolita's finger because she was pointing at him. She dies from an infection, although Den was kind enough to cauterize the wound with a soldering iron. With Milton's sexual orientation and affair with Lolita exposed, Den manipulates Steven into stabbing and killing Milton with a crucifix-knife. He offers to let Steven get away with the killing, but recants, and when Steven attacks him in anger, Den beats him to death. The final scene has Cassandra verbally attacking the Bible and Den's beliefs. She calls out several mistakes that are written in this holy text and, thereby proves, if there is a God, he had no hand in the making of this religious manuscript. Den, after supposedly killing a few children, returns to kill Cassandra. He stabs her in the chest with the crucifix-knife. He taunts her about pulling the knife out so she can kill him. She doesn't and he feels that this is proof of the "no atheist in foxholes" theory. As he turns to leave, Cassandra removes the knife and tosses it at Den. The knife skewers his head. He removes the knife and rushes to kill her, but convulses and dies on her. Cassandra is unable to escape and dies. Their final death tableau forms the Pietà position.

== Cast ==
- Greg Arce as Den
- Stephanie Rettig as Lolita
- Lee Schall as Steven
- Dana J. Ryan as Cassandra
- Sabrina O'Neil as Milton

== Awards ==
- 2002, won 'best actress' at the Melbourne Underground Film Festival for Dana J. Ryan
- 2002, won 'best actor' at the New York City Horror Film Festival for Dana J. Ryan
