= Maurice Chauncy =

Maurice Chauncy (c. 1509–1581) was an English Catholic priest and Carthusian monk.

== Life ==
Maurice Chauncy was born at an uncertain date, the eldest son of John Chauncy, esq., of Ardeley, Hertfordshire, by his first wife, Elizabeth, widow of Richard Manfield, and daughter and heiress of John Proflit of Barcombe, Sussex.

He may have studied at Oxford, and afterwards went to Gray's Inn for a course of law, but his meanderings led him to enter the London Charterhouse which years earlier had attracted another law student, Thomas More.

In 1535, the majority of the Carthusians refused to take the Oath of Supremacy, but Chauncy, on his own confession, agreed to it.

In consequence of their refusal, on 4 May 1535, along with the Bridgettine monk Richard Reynolds, the three Carthusian Priors of London, Beauvale and Axholme, John Houghton, Robert Lawrence, and Augustine Webster went to their deaths, and during the next five years fifteen of the London Carthusians perished on the scaffold or were starved to death in Newgate gaol.

After the "surrender" of the monastery in 1537, Chauncy with a few others still at liberty joined the Carthusians of Sheen who had settled in Bruges. With the accession of Queen Mary hopes for a Catholic restoration revived and some nineteen monks belonging to various houses gathered at Sheen, Chauncy being elected prior there in 1556.

With the dramatic reversal of 1558, they retired again to Bruges, living with their Flemish brethren until 1569, when they obtained a house on their own in St Clare Street, Chauncy still being the prior. When the hostility of the Calvinists compelled the community to leave Bruges in 1578 they attempted to settle at Douai. After this attempt failed, they retired to Louvain in May 1578.

Chauncy died at the old house in Bruges on 2 July 1581.

The English community kept together with varying fortunes, until the charterhouse of Sheen Anglorum at Nieuwpoort in Flanders, at that time with a community of six choir monks and two donnés, was suppressed by Joseph II in 1783.

== Works ==
Chauncy was haunted by his weakness in taking the oath of supremacy and wrote a number of works telling the story of his brethren, in which he mentions his lapse:

- Historia aliquot nostri saeculi Martyrum in Anglia, etc. (Mainz, 1550, and Bruges, 1583)
- Commentariolus de vitae ratione et martyrio octodecim Cartusianorum qui in Anglia sub rege trucidati sunt (Ghent, 1608), a portion of which was reprinted
- Vitae Martyrum Cartusianorum aliquot, qui Londini pro Unitate Ecclesiae adversus haereticos, etc. (Milan, 1606)
