= Denn, County Cavan =

Place in the Republic of Ireland

Coordinates: 53°55′12″N 7°17′8″W

Denn is a civil parish in County Cavan in the Republic of Ireland with three churches.

== Ethnology ==
The name Denn is derived from the Old Irish word dionga, meaning 'fortress'. The townlands of Denbann and Denmore roughly translate to the 'white fort' and the 'large fort' respectively.

== Location ==
Denn is located between the towns of Cavan and Ballyjamesduff in County Cavan, Ireland. It is part of the baronies of Castlerahan, Clanmahon and Loughtee Upper. The parish is located nearby to the small mountain Slieve Glah. The village of Crosskeys, in the Barony of Loughtee Upper, is located in the centre of the parish.

== Amenities ==
Denn has one Anglican (Denmore church) and two Catholic churches (St. Matthew's in Crosskeys and Drumavaddy in Carrickaboy), A Gaelic football club (Denn GFC) a national school (Crosskeys National School), a resource center, a community center and an inn.

== Townlands ==
There are 58 townlands in Denn parish:

- Acres
- Aghadoon or Ravenfield
- Aghadreenagh
- Aghalattafraal
- Aghateggal/Ryefort
- Aghavaddy
- Aghnahaia Glebe
- Ardkill Beg
- Ardkill More
- Ardlougher
- Ardvarny
- Banagher
- Blackbull
- Carn
- Carrickaboy Glebe
- Carrickatober
- Corglass
- Cornagrow
- Cornamahan
- Cornaseer
- Corrakane
- Corraweelis
- Crumlin
- Denn Glebe
- Dennbane
- Dennmore/Leggandenn
- Derrylurgan
- Drumavaddy
- Drumbarry
- Drumcanon
- Drumcrow
- Drumhirk
- Drumliff
- Farragh
- Gallon Glebe
- Gallonbulloge/Blackbull
- Killycannan
- Killynanum
- Killyteane
- Killyvally
- Kilnacor
- Kilnacreevy
- Lackanclare
- Lackanduff
- Lackanmore
- Largan
- Leggandenn
- Lishenry
- Lislea
- Lismeen
- Lonnogs
- Moher
- Newtown
- Pollafree
- Pollakeel
- Pottle
- Pottlesoden
- Ranrenagh
- Ravenfield
- Ryefort
- Shannow
- Tullytreane
