= Parastenolechia claustrifera =

Scientific classification
- Kingdom: Animalia
- Phylum: Arthropoda
- Class: Insecta
- Order: Lepidoptera
- Family: Gelechiidae
- Genus: Parastenolechia
- Species: P. claustrifera

Binomial name
- Parastenolechia claustrifera (Meyrick, 1935)

Synonyms
- Telphusa claustrifera Meyrick, 1935

Species of moth

Parastenolechia claustrifera is a moth of the family Gelechiidae. It is found in China (Zhejiang) and Taiwan.

The wingspan is about 12 mm.
