= James Duckett =

English printer, tailor and Roman Catholic martyr

Blessed James Duckett
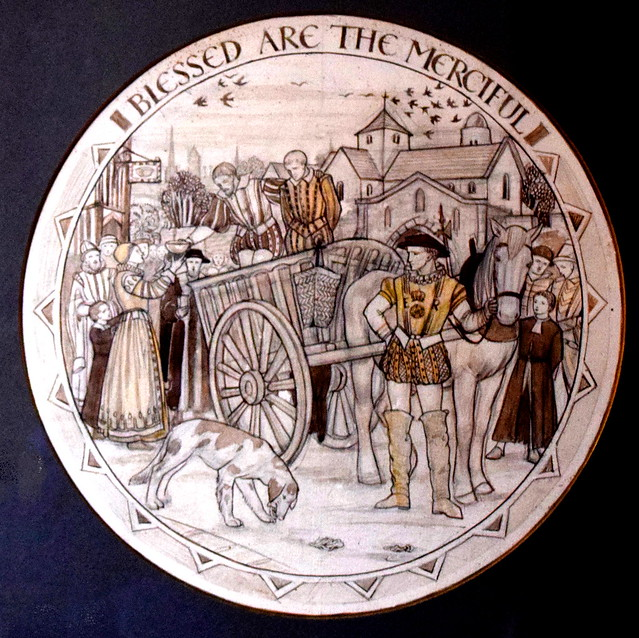
- Detail of a stained glass window in Tyburn Convent by Margaret Agnes Rope

Layman
- Born: Gilfortrigs, Skelsmergh, Westmorland, England
- Died: 19 April 1602, Tyburn, Middlesex, England
- Venerated in: Roman Catholic Church
- Beatified: 15 December 1929, by Pope Pius XI
- Feast: 19 April
- Patronage: Booksellers, Publishers

James Duckett (died 19 April 1602) was an English Catholic layman and martyr, executed at Tyburn for printing Catholic devotionals.

== Life ==
James Duckett was born at Gilfortrigs in the parish of Skelsmergh in Westmorland at an unknown date. Brought up a Protestant, he was converted by a book: a friend of his, Peter Mauson lent him The Foundation of the Catholic Religion while Duckett was serving his apprenticeship to a book printer in London, and he decided to become a Catholic. He was twice imprisoned for not attending the Protestant services, first in Bridewell, then in the compter. Both times his employer interceded and got him freed. But then the employer asked James to find a job elsewhere.

He was received into the Catholic Church by an old priest named Weekes who was imprisoned in the Gatehouse at Westminster. Two or three years later, about 1590, he married a Catholic widow, Anne Hart. Out of his twelve years of married life, nine were spent in prison for his new faith. Their son later became a Carthusian monk and recorded much of what we know about his father. Duckett made his living at that time as a tailor, also making garments, vestments, and altar linens for priests.

He was active in propagating Catholic literature. His house was searched, and upon finding a press and copies of Our Lady's Psalter, Ducket was confined to The Clink on St. Thomas' Day before Christmas. He then spent two years in Newgate Prison before being released on bond. Ten weeks later his house was searched again, and although Duckett was able to leave by the back door, he later surrendered to protect those who had posted his bond. He was then sent to The Clink. He was briefly released at the petition of two Protestant midwives when his wife went into labor, but subsequently picked up when it was found that he had sent some English and Latin primers to a bookbinder. He was again released, two knights of the shire going surety for him.

He was finally betrayed by Peter Bullock, a bookbinder, who acted in order to obtain his own release from prison. Duckett's house was searched on 4 March 1602 and he was arrested on a charge of having 25 copies of Fr. Southwell's books on his premises. For this he was at once thrown into Newgate.

At the trial, Bullock testified that he had bound various Catholic books for Duckett, who admitted this but denied other false accusations in a self-possessed manner. The jury found him not guilty; but the judge, Sir John Popham, the Lord Chief Justice, browbeat the jury, which reversed its verdict and Duckett was found guilty of felony. Despite the betrayal of Duckett, Bullock was taken to his death at Tyburn in the same cart as Duckett on 19 April 1601.

James Duckett's son was the John Duckett who was Prior of the English Carthusians at Nieuwpoort in Flanders from 1644 to 1647. He related that on the way to Tyburn his father was handed a cup of wine, which he drank, and told his wife to drink to Peter Bullock and to forgive him. When she declined, he chided her gently until she did. On arrival at Tyburn Tree James kissed and embraced Bullock, beseeching him to die in the Catholic faith, without success.

At the same trial three priests, Thomas Tichborne, Robert Watkinson, and Francis Page, were condemned to death. For some reason their execution was remanded to the following day.

James Duckett was beatified by Pope Pius XI on 15 December 1929. John Duckett, a later priest and martyr, was probably his grandson.

== Veneration ==
James Duckett is regarded as a patron intercessor of booksellers and publishers.

== See also ==
- Catholic Church in the United Kingdom
- Douai Martyrs

== Sources ==
- See also Godfrey Anstruther, Seminary Priests, Mayhew-McCrimmond, Great Wakering, vol. 2, 1975, pp. 89–90.
- James Duckett, M.M. Merrick, (Douglas Organ, London 1947)
