= Champignolles, Eure =

Champignolles
- Part of La Vieille-Lyre
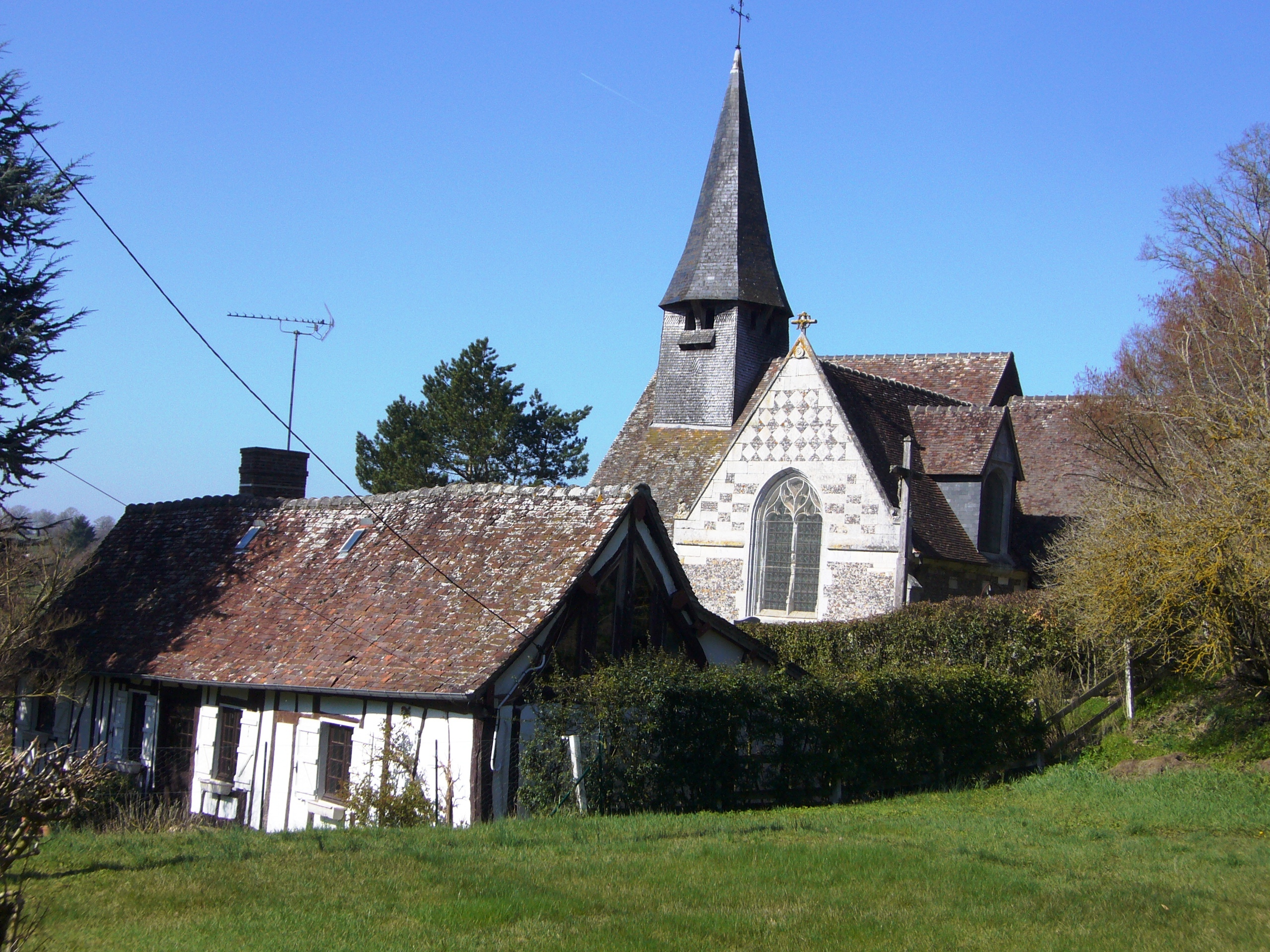
- The church in Champignolles

- Coat of arms
- Location of Champignolles
- Location within France Location within Normandy
- Coordinates: 48°57′22″N 0°45′45″E
- Country: France
- Region: Normandy
- Department: Eure
- Arrondissement: Bernay
- Canton: Breteuil
- Commune: La Vieille-Lyre
- Area^{1}: 2.62 km^{2} (1.01 sq mi)
- Elevation: 159 m (522 ft)
- Highest elevation: 183 m (600 ft)
- Lowest elevation: 127 m (417 ft)
- Population (2023): 36
  - Density: 14/km^{2} (36/sq mi)
- Time zone: UTC+01:00 (CET)
  - Summer (DST): UTC+02:00 (CEST)
- Postal code: 27330
- ^{1} French Land Register data, which excludes lakes, ponds, glaciers > 1 km^{2} (0.386 sq mi or 247 acres) and river estuaries.

Champignolles (French pronunciation: [ʃɑ̃piɲɔl]) is a former commune in the Eure department in northern France. On 1 January 2019, it was merged into the commune La Vieille-Lyre.

== See also ==
- Communes of the Eure department
