= Larré, Morbihan =

Commune in Brittany, France

Larré Lare
- Commune
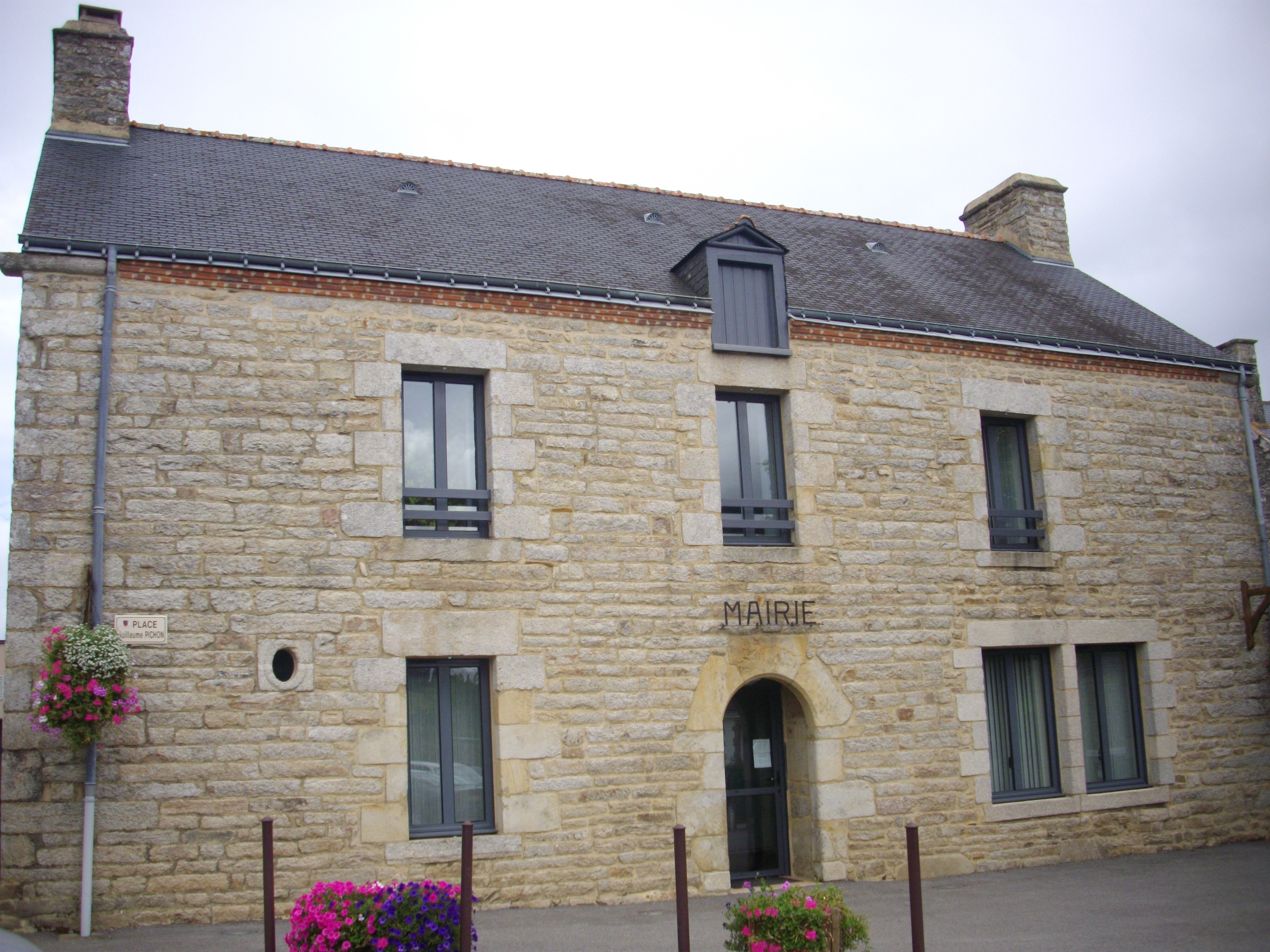
- The town hall in Larré

- Coat of arms
- Location of Larré
- Location within France Location within Brittany
- Coordinates: 47°42′45″N 2°30′55″W
- Country: France
- Region: Brittany
- Department: Morbihan
- Arrondissement: Vannes
- Canton: Questembert
- Intercommunality: Questembert Communauté

Government
  - Mayor (2026–32): Camille Le Claire
- Area^{1}: 17.02 km^{2} (6.57 sq mi)
- Highest elevation: 131 m (430 ft)
- Lowest elevation: 22 m (72 ft)
- Population (2023): 1,104
  - Density: 64.86/km^{2} (168.0/sq mi)
- Time zone: UTC+01:00 (CET)
  - Summer (DST): UTC+02:00 (CEST)
- INSEE/Postal code: 56108 /56230
- ^{1} French Land Register data, which excludes lakes, ponds, glaciers > 1 km^{2} (0.386 sq mi or 247 acres) and river estuaries.

Larré (French pronunciation: [laʁe]; Breton: Lare) is a commune in the Morbihan department of Brittany in north-western France.

== Geography ==
The river Arz forms all of the commune's northern border.

== Demographics ==
Inhabitants of Larré are called in French Larréens.

== See also ==
- Communes of the Morbihan department
