= Laer =

- Municipality
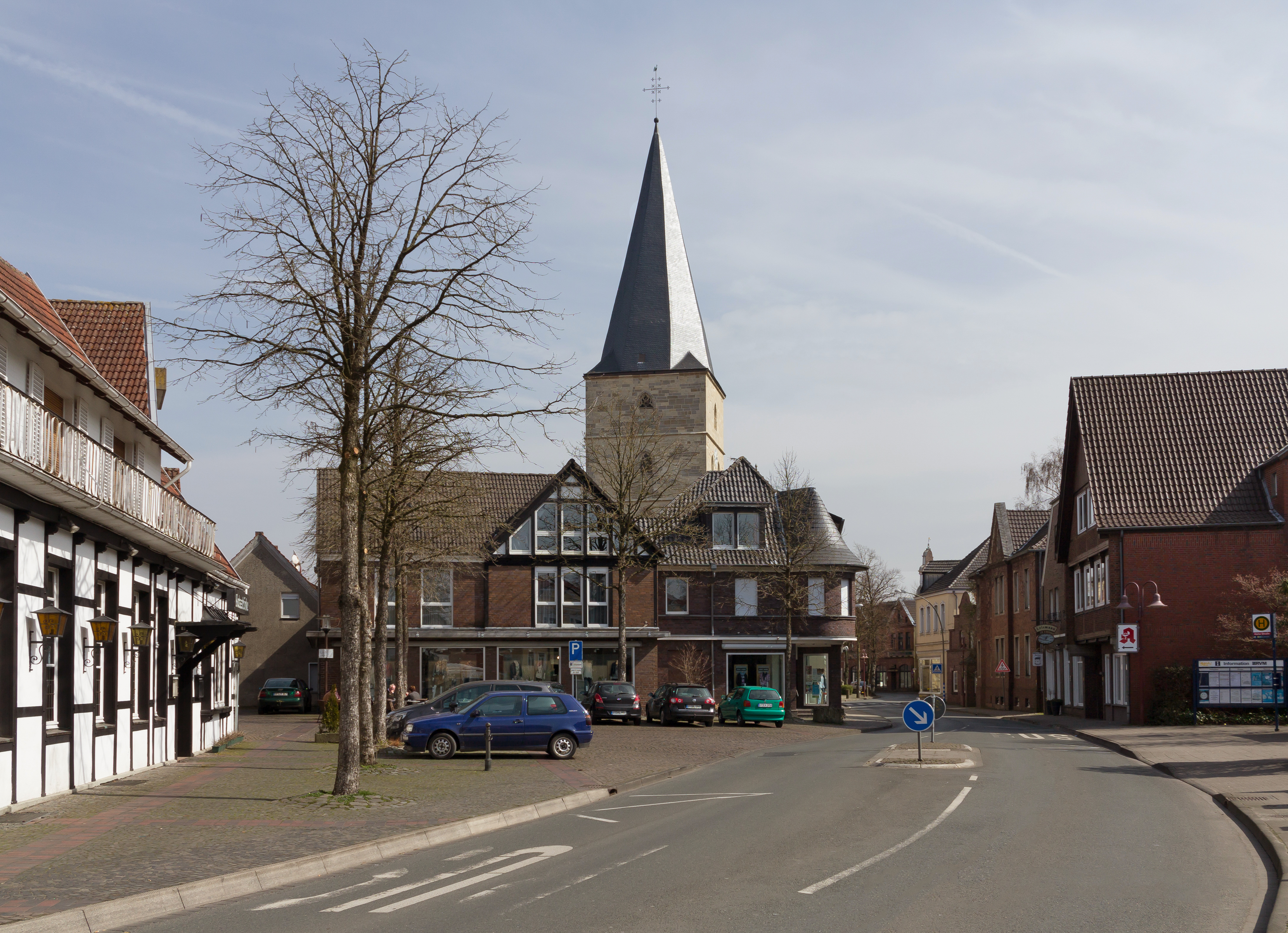
- Laer, church (Pfarrkirche Sankt Bartholomäus)

- Coat of arms

- Location of Laer within Steinfurt district
- Interactive map of Laer
- Location within Germany Location within North Rhine-Westphalia
- Coordinates: 52°03′17″N 7°21′25″E
- Country: Germany
- State: North Rhine-Westphalia
- Admin. region: Münster
- District: Steinfurt
- First mentioned: 1134

Government
  - Mayor (2020–25): Manfred Kluthe (CDU)

Area
  - Total: 35.26 km^{2} (13.61 sq mi)
- Elevation: 77 m (253 ft)

Population (2025-12-31)
  - Total: 7,053
  - Density: 200.0/km^{2} (518.1/sq mi)
- Time zone: UTC+01:00 (CET)
  - Summer (DST): UTC+02:00 (CEST)
- Postal codes: 48366
- Dialling codes: 02554
- Vehicle registration: ST, BF, TE
- Website: www.laer.de

Laer (German pronunciation: [ˈlaːɐ̯]) is a municipality in the district of Steinfurt, in North Rhine-Westphalia, Germany.

Since the ae spelling already contradicted the rules in force before 1996, it was not amended in accordance with a recommendation of the Standing Committee on Geographical Names.

== Geography ==
The municipality is situated approximately 20 kilometres (12 mi) north-west of Münster.

Laer borders to Horstmar in the west, Steinfurt in the north, Altenberge in the east, Billerbeck and Rosendahl in the south.

The municipality of Laer consists of the districts of Laer and Holthausen. Holthausen is located around two kilometers south of Laer and has around 600 inhabitants.

== Population ==
Historical population

Year	Pop.	±% p.a.
1965	4,064	—
1970	4,548	+2.28%
1975	4,937	+1.65%
1980	5,218	+1.11%
1985	5,250	+0.12%
1990	5,300	+0.19%
1995	5,999	+2.51%

Year	Pop.	±% p.a.
2000	6,378	+1.23%
2005	6,378	+0.00%
2010	6,289	−0.28%
2015	6,721	+1.34%
2020	6,700	−0.06%
2025	7,053	+1.03%

Source: Landesdatabank Nordrhein-Westfalen

== Gallery ==
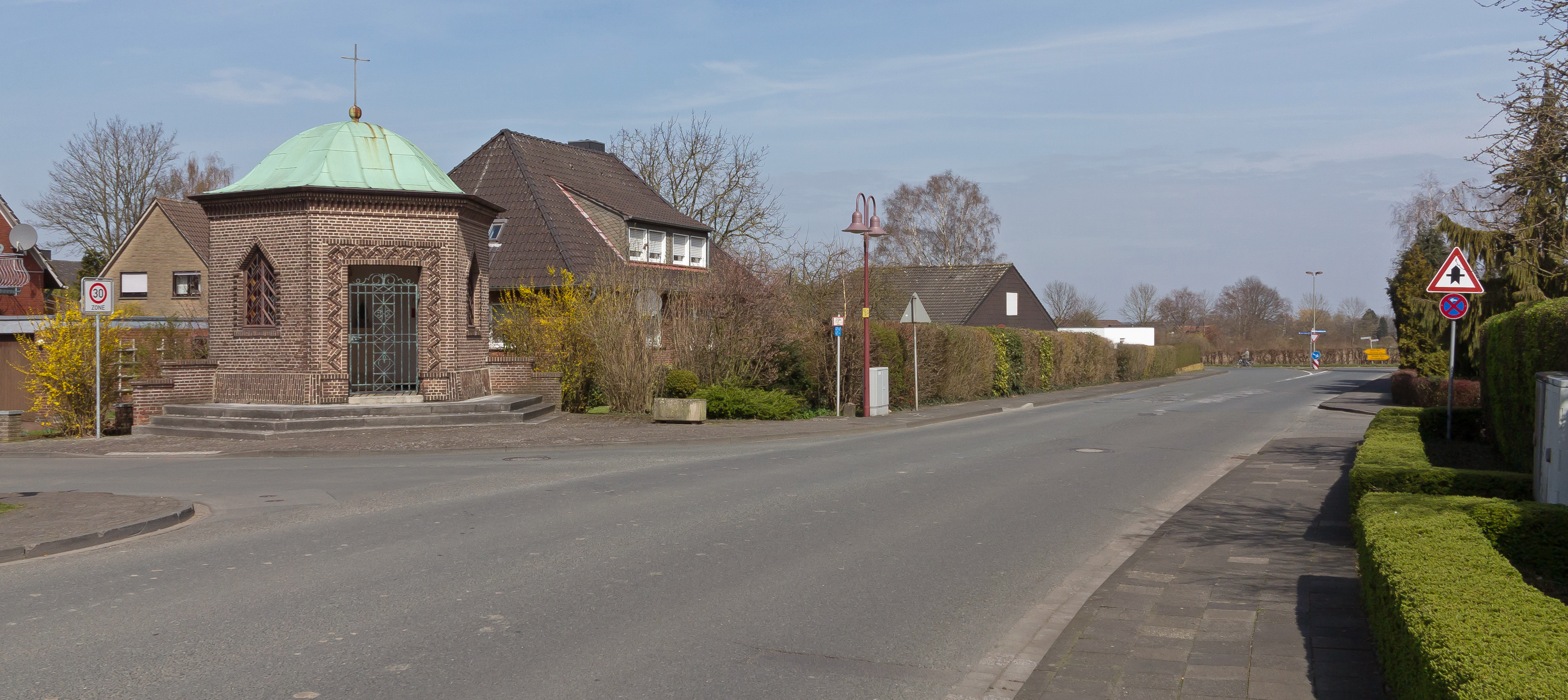
Laer, chapel in the street

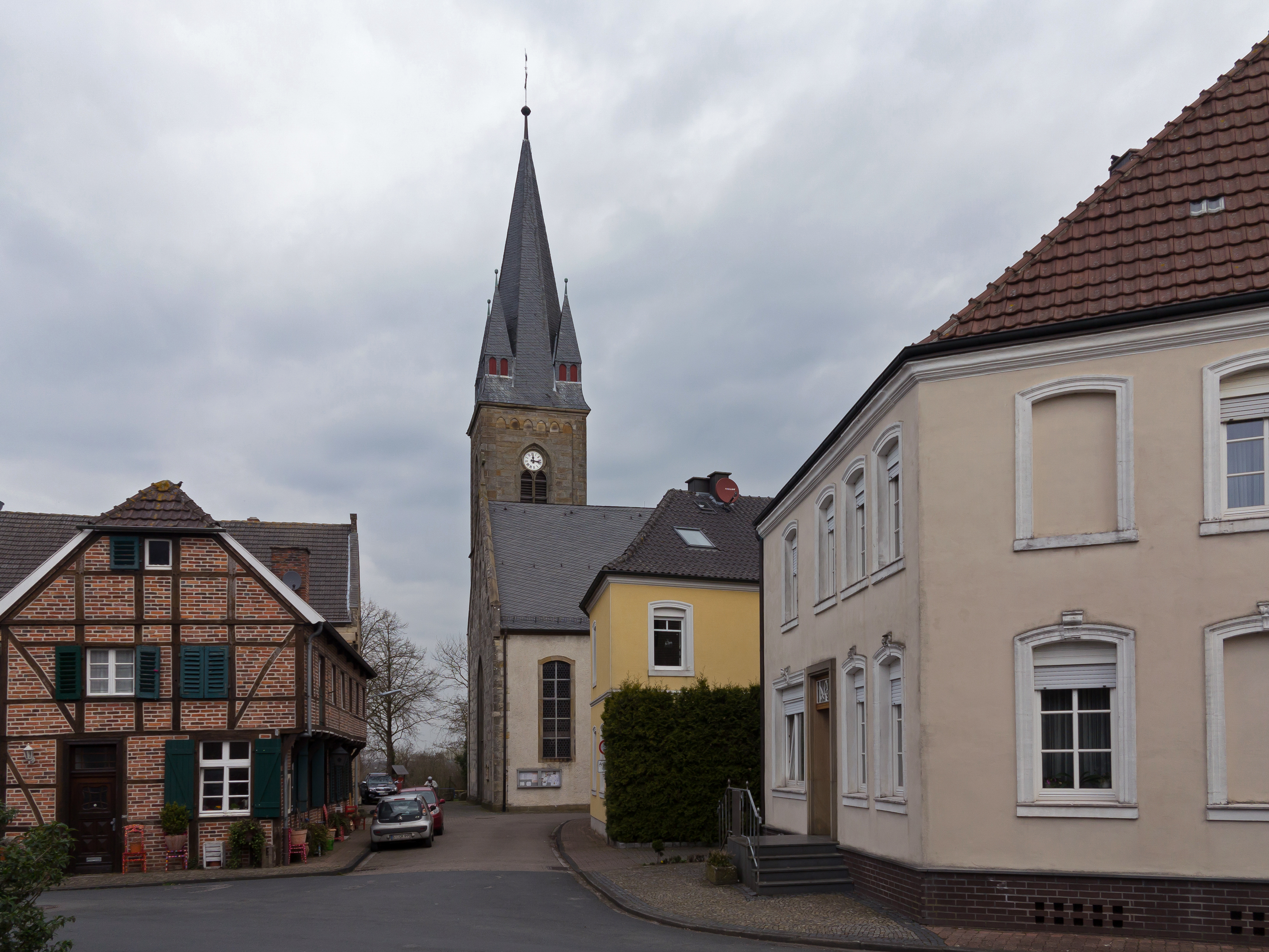
Holthausen, church (Pfarrkirche Sankt Marien)

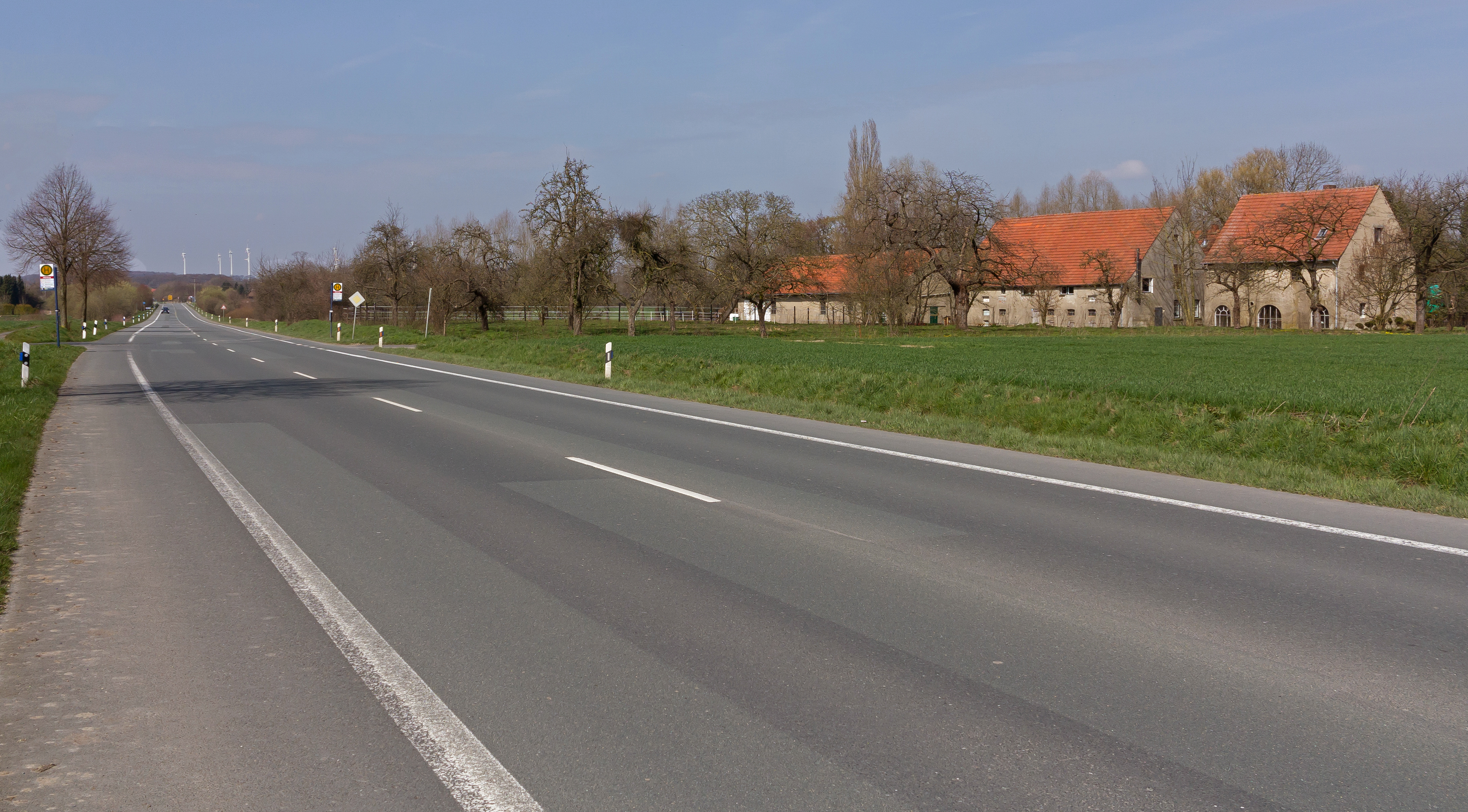
Altenburg, street view from local road
