= La Vieille-Lyre =

- Commune
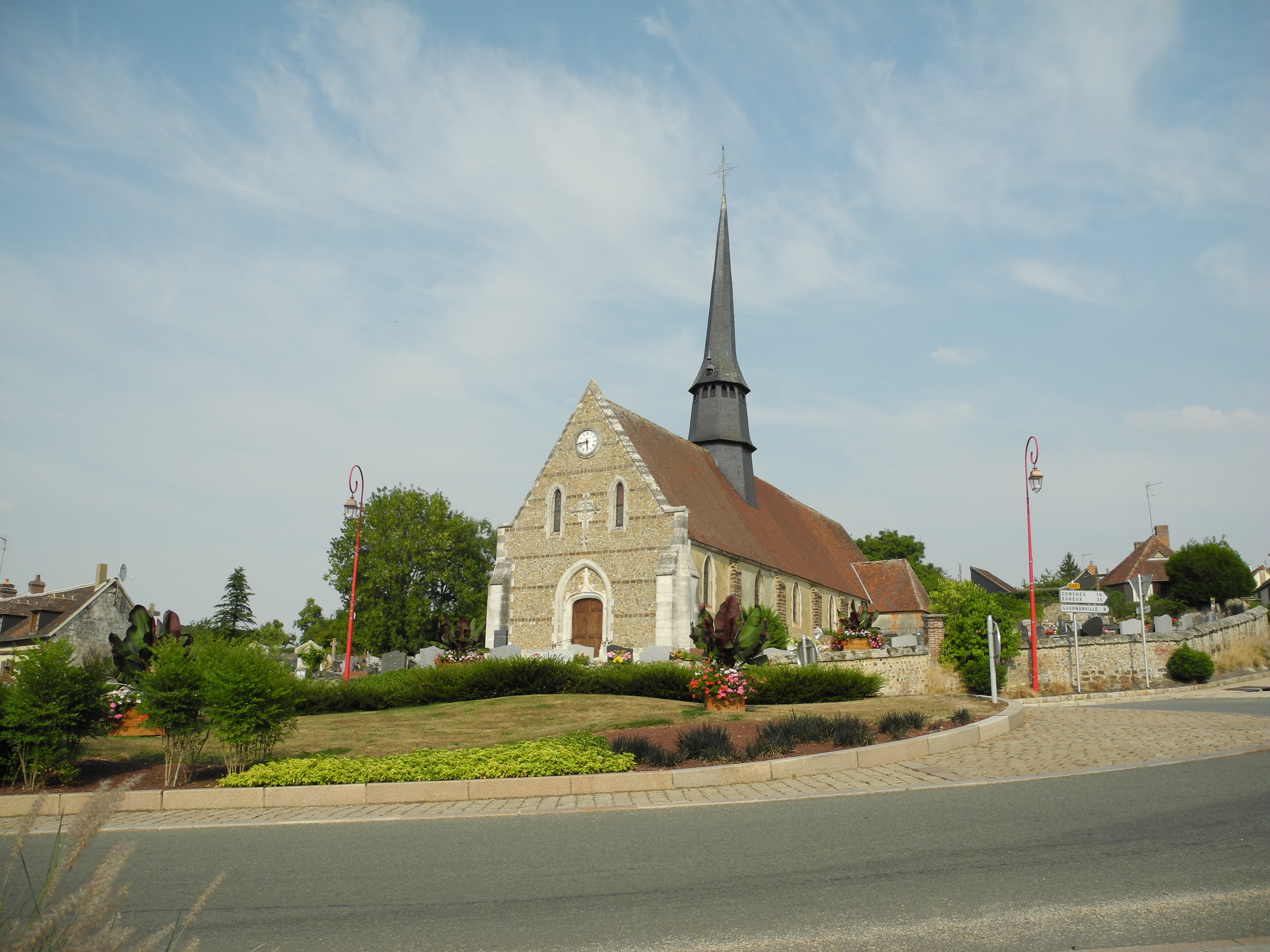
- Église Saint-Pierre

- Coat of arms
- Location of La Vieille-Lyre
- Location within France Location within Normandy
- Coordinates: 48°55′07″N 0°45′03″E
- Country: France
- Region: Normandy
- Department: Eure
- Arrondissement: Bernay
- Canton: Breteuil
- Intercommunality: Normandie Sud Eure

Government
  - Mayor (2020–2026): Marc Morière
- Area^{1}: 19.63 km^{2} (7.58 sq mi)
- Highest elevation: 187 m (614 ft)
- Lowest elevation: 127 m (417 ft)
- Population (2023): 648
  - Density: 33.0/km^{2} (85.5/sq mi)
- Time zone: UTC+01:00 (CET)
  - Summer (DST): UTC+02:00 (CEST)
- INSEE/Postal code: 27685 /27330
- ^{1} French Land Register data, which excludes lakes, ponds, glaciers > 1 km^{2} (0.386 sq mi or 247 acres) and river estuaries.

La Vieille-Lyre (French pronunciation: [la vjɛj liʁ], lit. 'The Old Lyre') is a commune in the Eure department in Normandy in northern France. On 1 January 2019, the former commune Champignolles was merged into La Vieille-Lyre.

== Geography ==
The commune along with another 69 communes shares part of a 4,747 hectare, Natura 2000 conservation area, called Risle, Guiel, Charentonne.

== Population ==
Historical population
Year	Pop.	±% p.a.
1968	571	—
1975	626	+1.32%
1982	644	+0.41%
1990	604	−0.80%
1999	636	+0.58%
2007	663	+0.52%
2012	670	+0.21%
2017	651	−0.57%
2023	648	−0.08%
Source: INSEE

== See also ==
- Communes of the Eure department
