= Dorothy Arundell =

English author and nun (c. 1550–1613)

- Born: 1550
- Died: 1613 (aged 62–63); Brussels
- Occupations: Benedictine nun and biographer

Dorothy Arundell (c. 1550 – 1613) was an English author and Benedictine nun in Brussels. Her Catholic family's priest and three others were arrested and executed. She and her sister went to Brussels where they entered the English Benedictine convent there. She wrote a biography of the priest who was later beatified. She was a key patron of the first of the 22 English convents founded on the continent in the 1600s.

== Life ==
Arundell was born around 1550. Her parents were rich recusants. Her mother was Lady Anna Stourton and her father was Sir John Arundell who was a leader of the Catholic resistance to the new religion. They were accused of being supporters of Spain but they were royalists. Her father was arrested several times. Her parents harboured Catholic priests and her uncle left her jewels in the hope that she would become a nun. Their family funded the education of John Cornelius who studied at the English College in Rome.

In 1583 Cornelius returned as a missionary to England. Cornelius was the family's priest and he formed a close relationship, particularly with Dorothy, whom he encouraged to become a nun.

In 1590 her mother moved the family and Cornelius to live in Devon after her father died. Cornelius was arrested at their home on 24 April 1594 by the sheriff of Dorsetshire. One of her relatives, Thomas Bosgrave, and two family servants, John (or Terence) Carey and Patrick Salmon, shared the same sentence.

Cornelius was tried and Dorothy claimed that she alone had hidden him. Four of them were sentenced to be hanged, drawn and quartered. On the night before Cornelius's execution she met him and he also wrote to her. He restated his wish that she should become a nun in the order of St Bridget.

In 1597 she was in Brussels and it was later said that Cornelius had appeared and he suggested that she change her plans and that she should join the new Benedictine convent there. Another English Catholic exile Mary Percy had just purchased a house in Brussels and she had asked Benedictine nun Joanne Berkeley to be the abbess. Whatever the reason, she and her sister, Gertrude, entered the new convent on 11 July 1598 and Dorothy took her habit in the following year. The dowry that they brought to the convent was invaluable and the convent thrived. Dorothy may have completed her Life of Father Cornelius, at the convent.

== Death and legacy ==
Arundell died in 1613 in the convent in Brussels. Her biography of Cornelius was in the Vatican archives, but is now lost.

The Benedictine convent in Brussels, the Abbey of the Glorious Assumption of Our Lady, was funded by her family's gift. The convent dates its establishment as 1597/98 and it was the first of the 22 English convents founded on the continent during the 1600s.
