= Theodoor van Loon =

Flemish Baroque painter

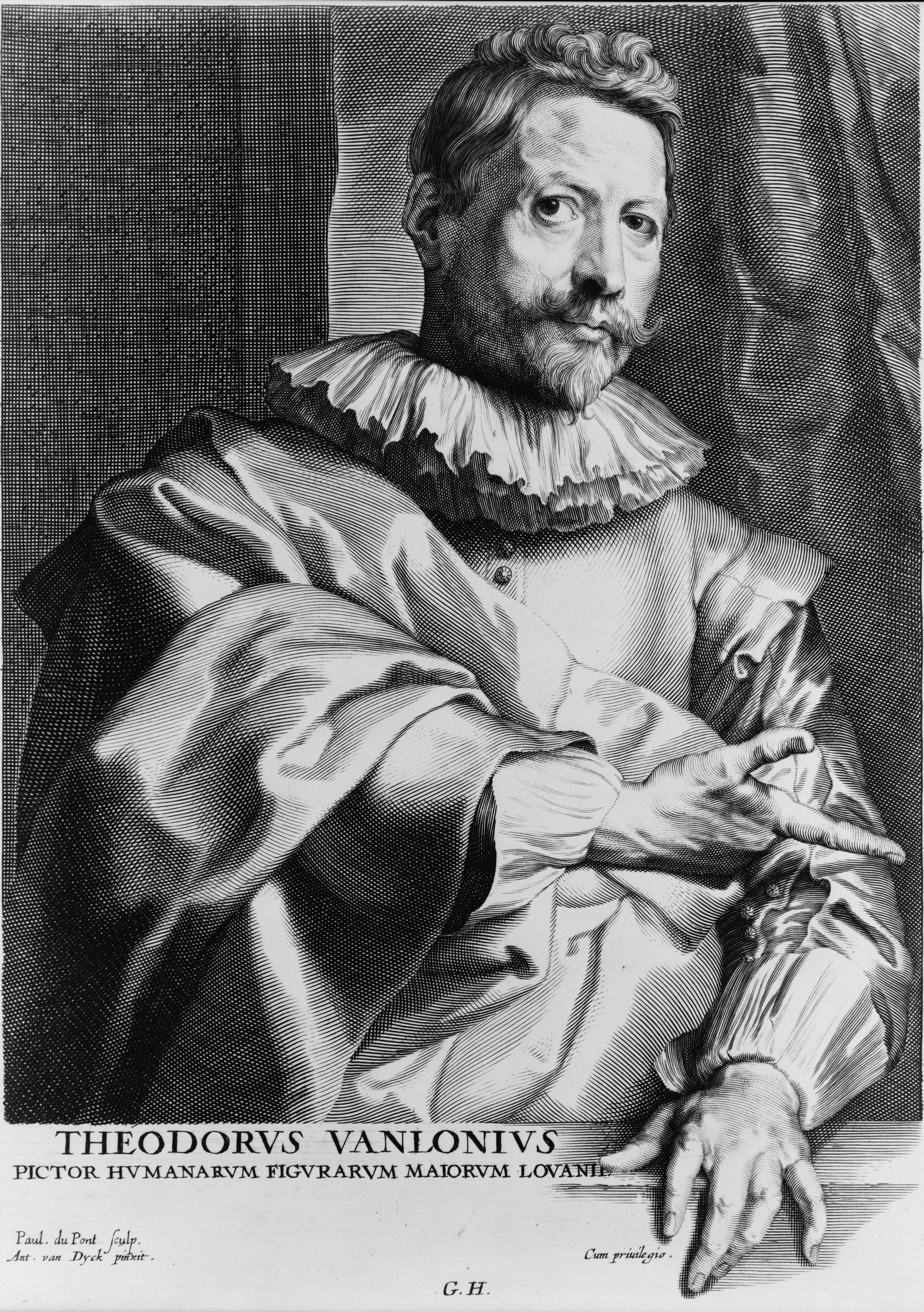
- Portrait of Theodoor van Loon by Paulus Pontius, after Anthony van Dyck
- Born: 1581 or 1582; Erkelenz, Upper Guelders, Habsburg Netherlands
- Died: 16 February 1649 (aged 67–68); Maastricht, Dutch Republic
- Known for: Painting
- Movement: Baroque

Theodoor van Loon (1581 or 1582 – February 1649) was a Flemish Baroque painter.

== Life ==
Theodoor van Loon traveled twice to Italy, from 1602 to 1608 and from 1628 to 1629. He is known as a follower of Caravaggio.

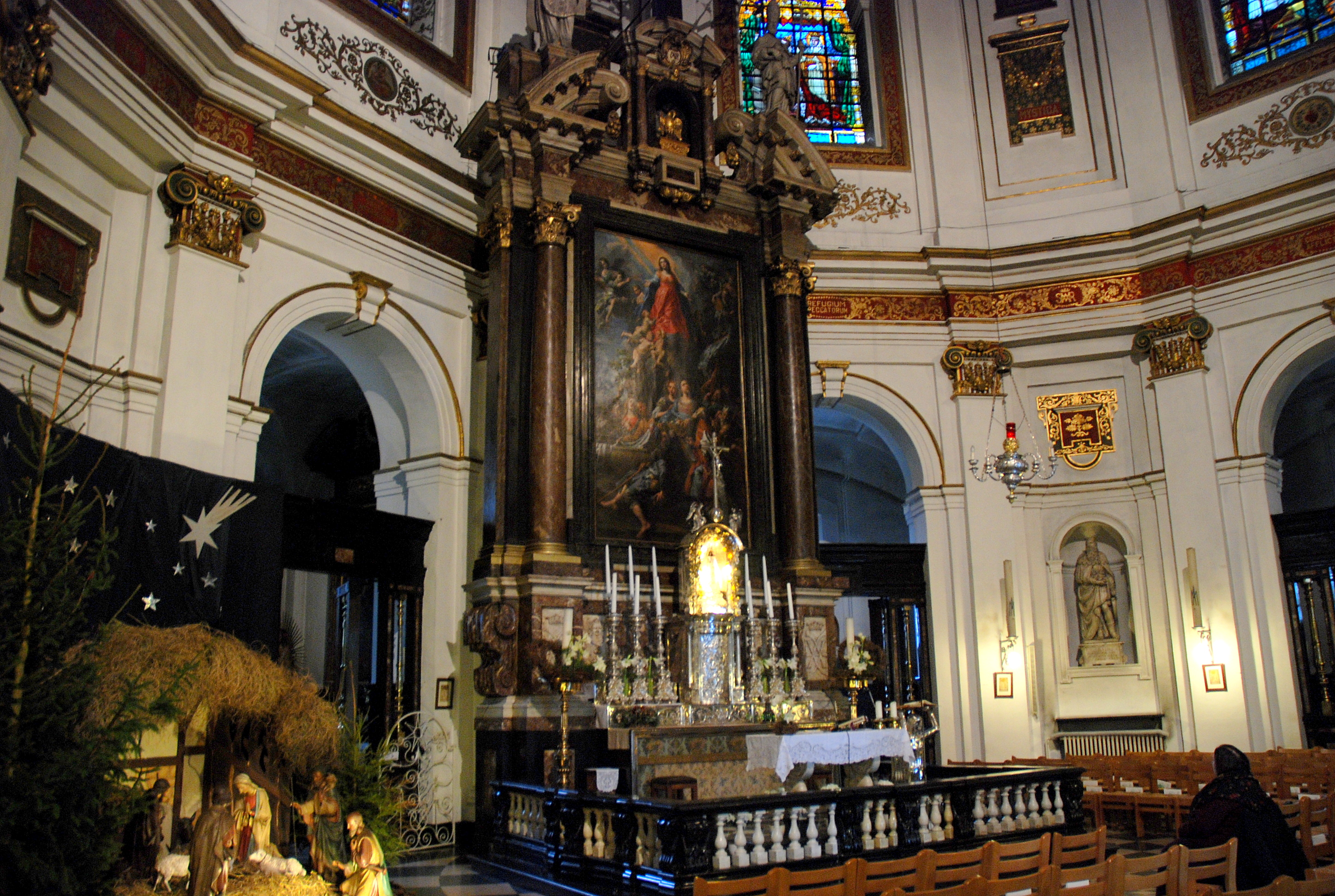
Photo of altarpiece by Theo Van Loon in the Scherpenheuvel basilica.

Together with Wenzel Coebergher he completed commissions for Albert VII, Archduke of Austria and his wife Infanta Isabella Clara Eugenia of Spain. He also completed commissions for churches in the region of Brussels, and made an altarpiece for the Basilica of Our Lady of Scherpenheuvel (Mariataferelen, 1623–28).

He was friends with Erycius Puteanus, a professor from the University of Leuven.

According to Houbraken, his paintings show that he spent his training in Italy.

He moved to Maastricht around 1648, where he lived above the proch in the house Wintmolen on Maastrichts's Grote Straat. He died in Maastricht and was buried in Sint-Janskerk on 16 February 1649.

== Works ==
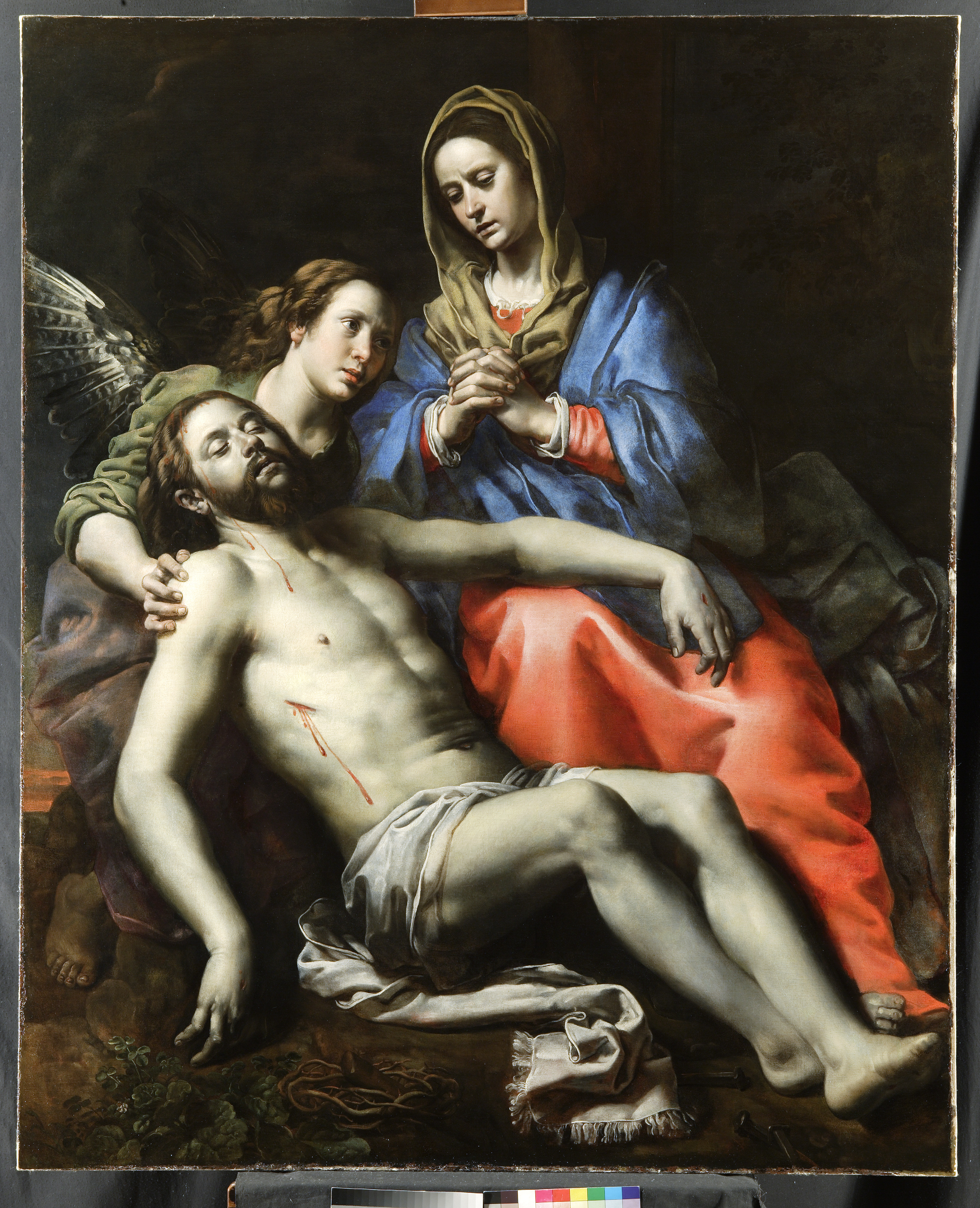
Lamentation of Christ, between 1582 and 1660, for Scherpenheuvel Basilica

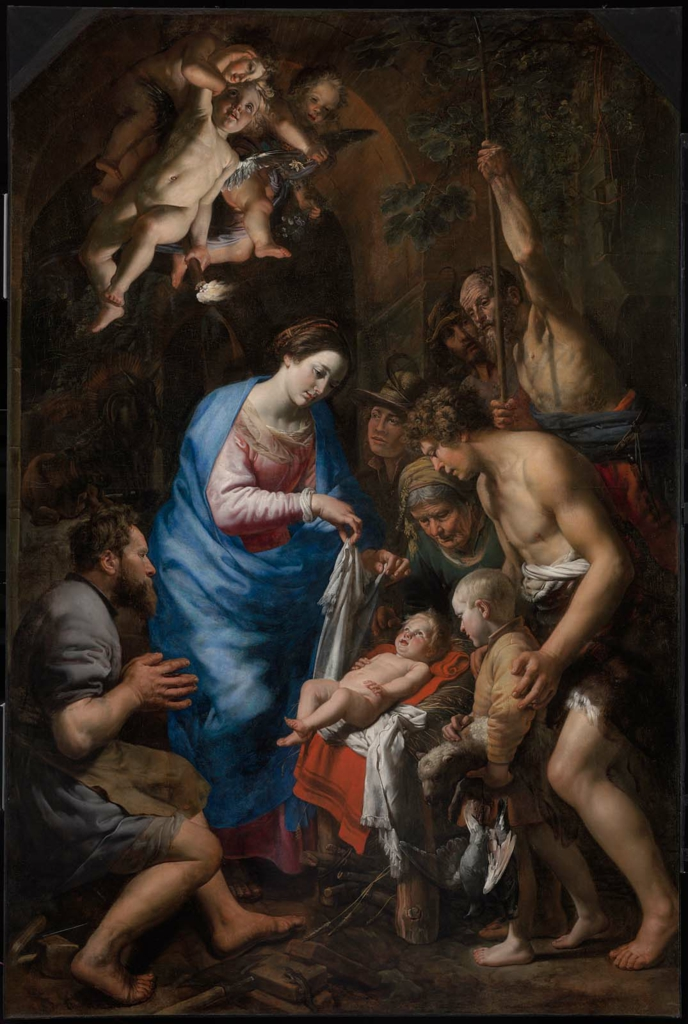
The Adoration of the Shepherds, 1620s, Museum of Fine Arts, Boston

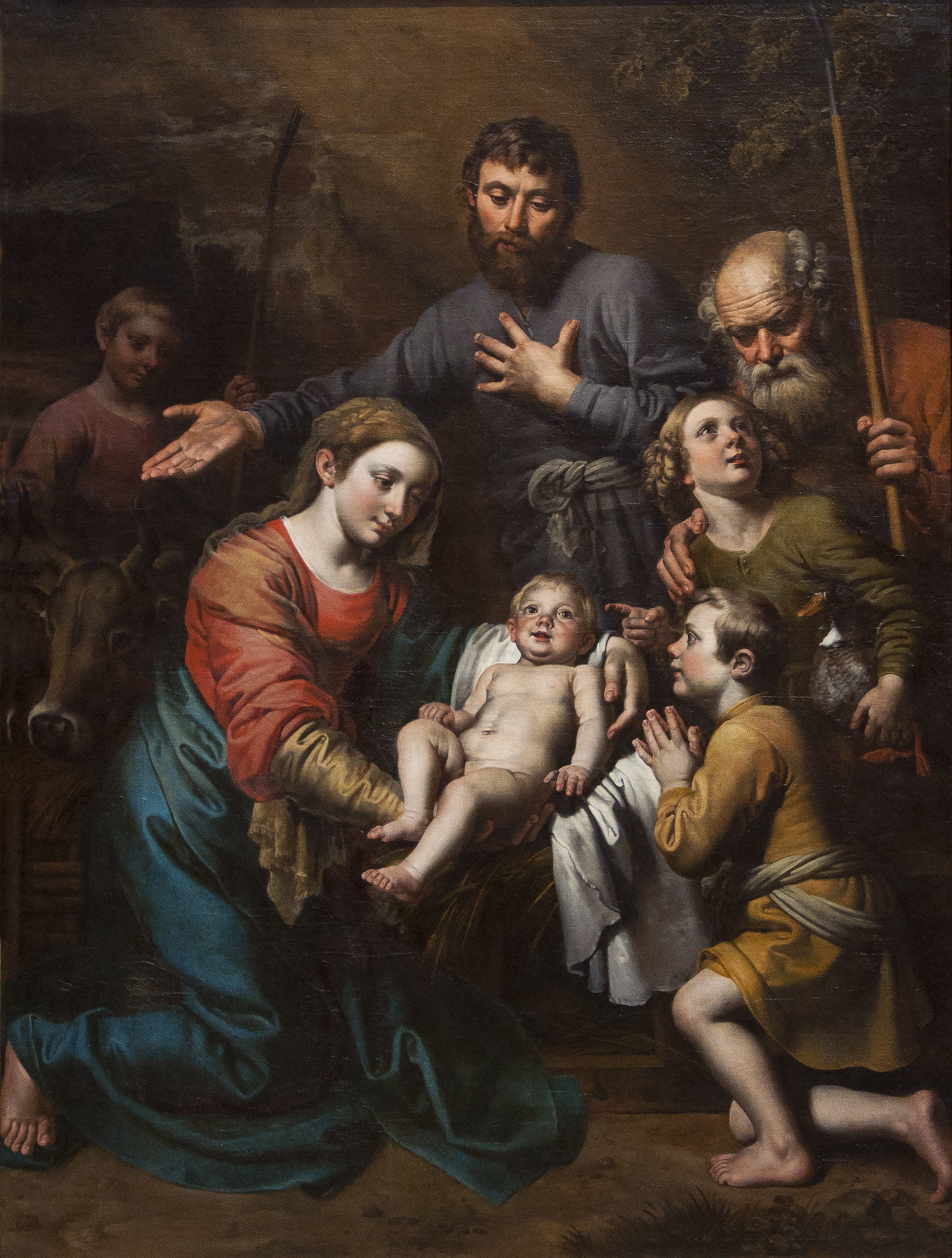
The Adoration of the Shepherds, Royal Museums of Fine Arts of Belgium

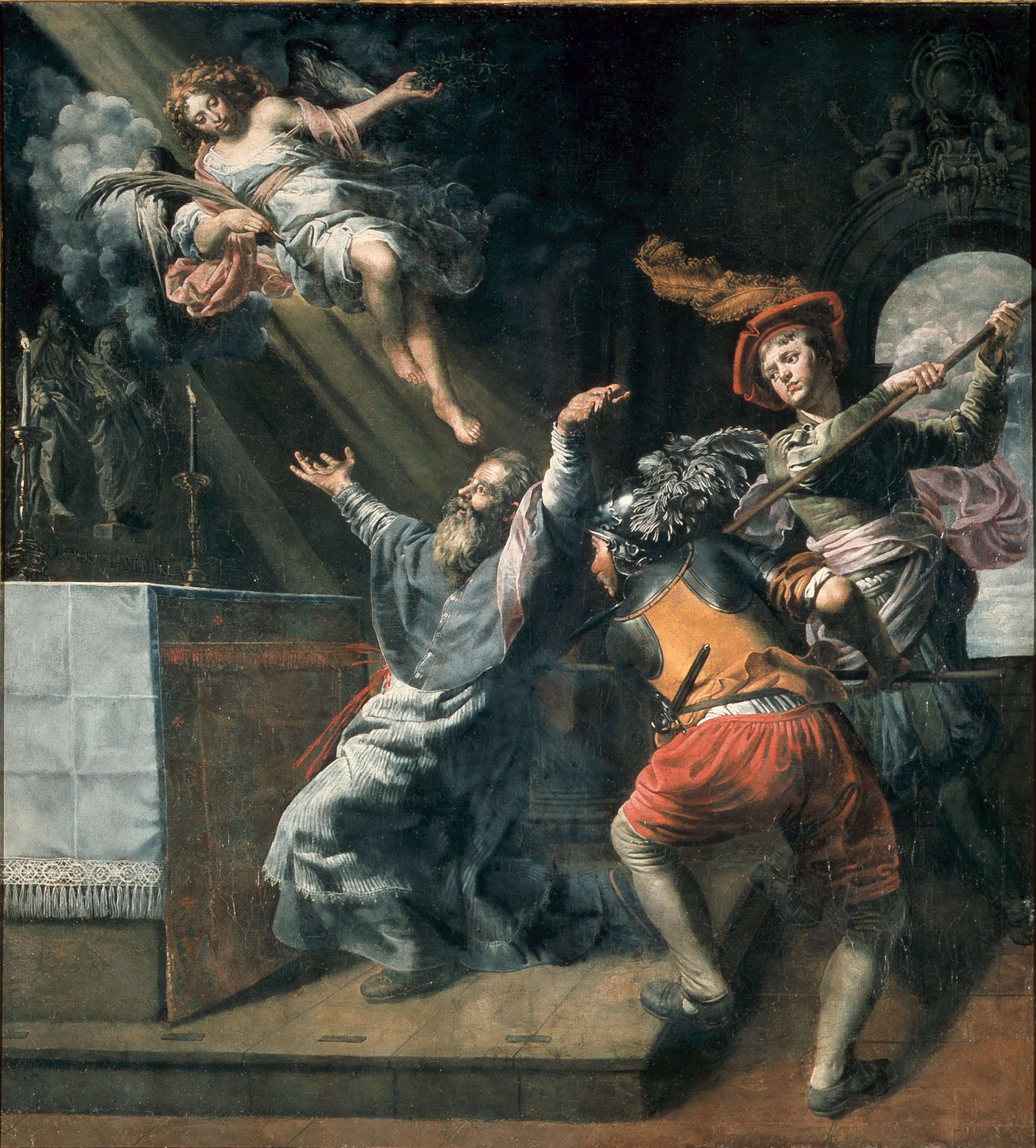
The Martyrdom of Saint Lambert, ca. 1616–1617, Royal Institute for Cultural Heritage

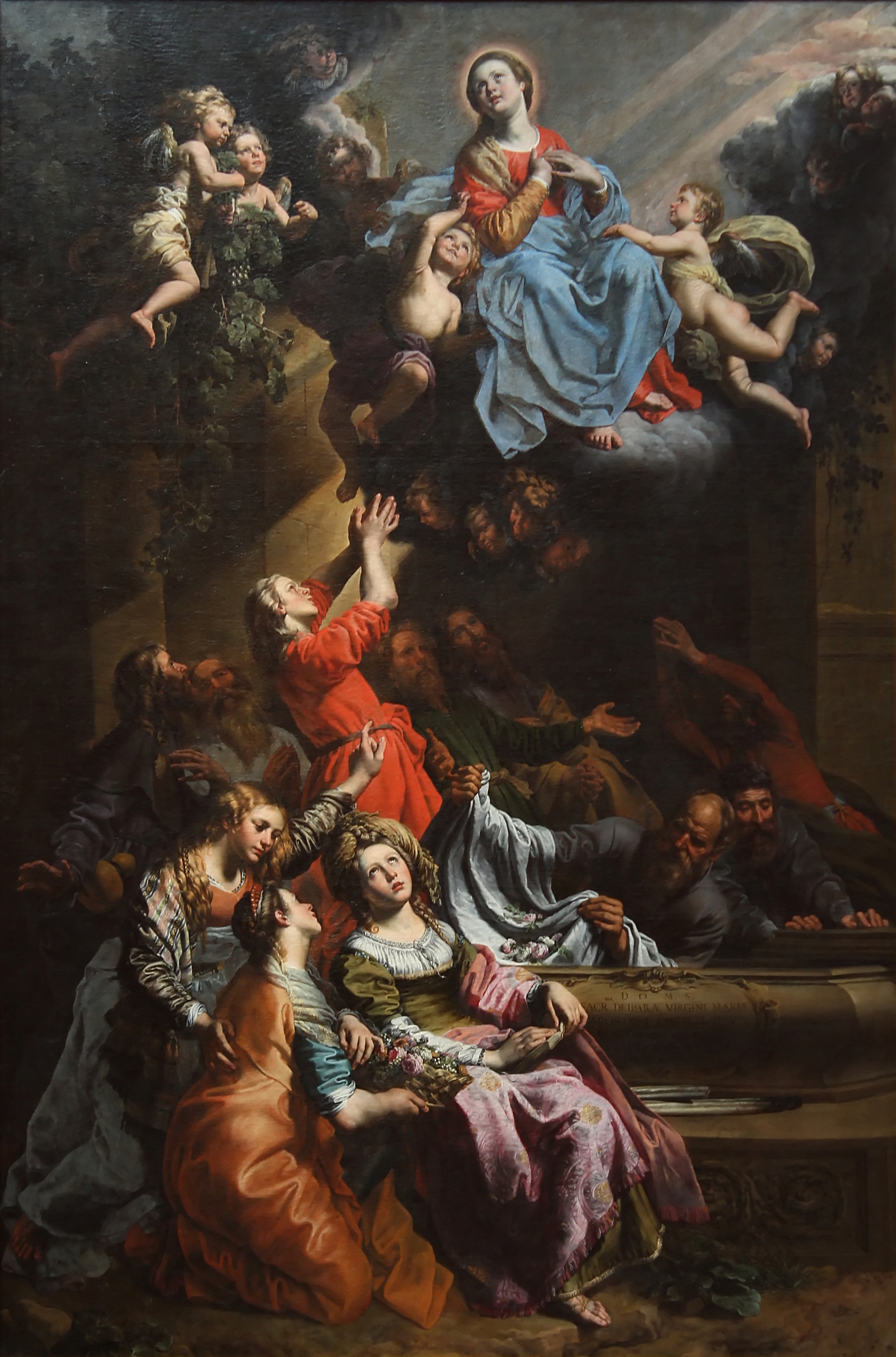
Assumption of Mary, Royal Museums of Fine Arts of Belgium
