= Achille Gagliardi =

Italian philosopher and theologian

- Born: 1537; Padua, Republic of Venice
- Died: 6 July 1607 (aged 69–70); Modena, Duchy of Modena and Reggio
- Alma mater: University of Padua
- Occupation: Philosopher; theologian
- Employer: Pontifical Gregorian University

Achille Gagliardi (1537–1607) was a Jesuit ascetic writer and spiritual director in the Ignatian tradition.

== Life ==
Gagliardi was born at Padua, Italy. After a brilliant career at the University of Padua he entered the Society of Jesus in 1559 with two brothers younger than himself. He taught philosophy at the Roman College, theology at Padua and Milan, and successfully directed several houses of his order in Northern Italy. He displayed indefatigable zeal in preaching, giving retreats and directing congregations, and was held in great esteem as a theologian and spiritual guide by the Archbishop of Milan, Charles Borromeo, whom he accompanied on his pastoral visitations, and at whose request he published his popular handbook of religion, Catechismo della fede cattolica (Milan, 1584).

In 1584 he was appointed spiritual director to the mystic Isabella Berinzaga. In this capacity, he asked her to provide sketches of her spiritual autobiography. These circulated in manuscript for some time and eventually formed the basis for the Breve compendio intorno alla perfezione cristiana (Brescia, 1611). This was translated into five languages, with the English translation Abridgement of Christian Perfection (1626) by Mary Percy.

In the 1590s, the relationship between Berinzaga and her confessor came under negative scrutiny, in large part due to his dissemination of Isabella's claim to have received divine intimations concerning the reform of the Society of Jesus as becoming too invested in education at the expense of direct evangelization. Claudio Acquaviva, attempting to reduce Gagliardi's influence, excluded him from the General Congregation of the Society held in Rome in the winter of 1593–1594, and ordered him to leave Milan. Gagliardi, however, received political support from Juan Fernández de Velasco, Spanish governor of Milan, and was able to have the order temporarily revoked. Ultimately, however, he was forced to leave Milan.

After an investigation by Robert Bellarmine, Gagliardi and Berinzaga were censured, and avoided being referred to the Roman Inquisition by accepting the censure. Gagliardi attributed all the offending views to Berinzaga.

Gagliardi died at Modena on 6 July 1607.

== Writings ==
His commentary on the Spiritual Exercises of Ignatius Loyola remained in manuscript until published as Commentarii in Exercitia spiritualia S.P. Ignatii de Loyala (Bruges, 1882). This explains very lucidly Loyola's suggestions for distinguishing between the good and evil external influences or internal motives which inspire or control human conduct.
