= Mathias Hovius =

Roman Catholic archbishop (1542–1620)

- Archbishop of Mechelen
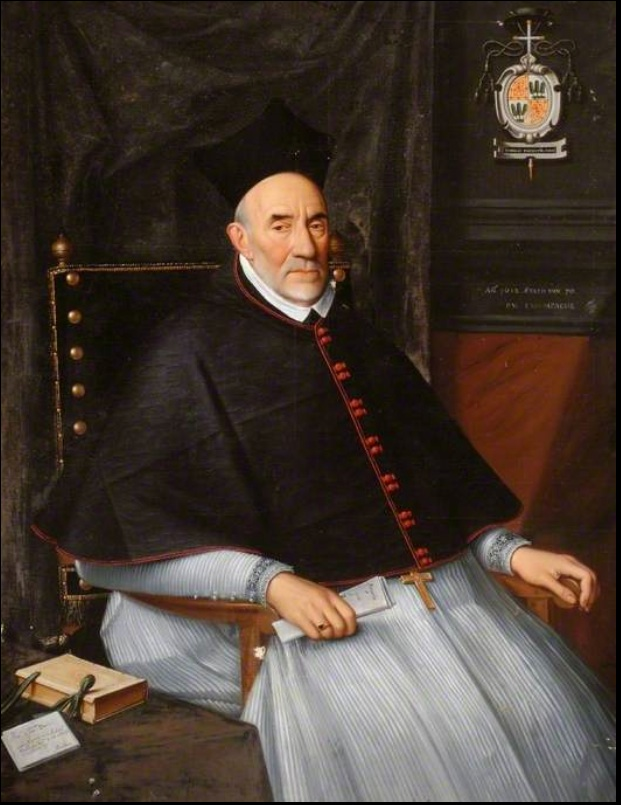
- Matthias Hovius – by Lucas Franchoys the Elder (attributed)
- Church: Roman Catholic
- Archdiocese: Mechelen
- See: St. Rumbold's Cathedral
- Installed: 1596
- Term ended: 1620
- Predecessor: Joannes Hauchin
- Successor: Jacobus Boonen

Orders
- Ordination: 1566
- Consecration: 18 February 1596

Personal details
- Born: 1542 Mechelen
- Died: 30 May 1620 (aged 77–78) Affligem
- Buried: St. Rumbold's Cathedral
- Education: University of Leuven
- Motto: Superat Patientia Fortem (Patience Overcomes the Strong)

Mathias Hovius (1542–1620), born Matthijs Van Hove, was the third Archbishop of Mechelen from 1596 to 1620. As Archbishop, Hovius presided over implementing the Catholic Reformation in the Spanish Netherlands.

== Early career ==
Hovius was born in Mechelen in 1542; his father was a fuller. Hovius attended the Standonck College in Mechelen, and later studied theology and philosophy at Leuven University, and was ordained priest in 1566, the year iconoclasm broke out in the Netherlands. While pastor at Saints Peter and Paul's Church in Mechelen, Hovius witnessed the Spanish Fury at Mechelen in 1572, and the English Fury at Mechelen in 1580, both during the Eighty Years' War.

== Vicar-General ==
Hovius was appointed vicar-general of the archdiocese of Mechelen upon the death of Archbishop Joannes Hauchin in 1589.

== Archbishop ==
In 1596, Hovius was consecrated the third Archbishop of Mechelen. Among his accomplishments were the founding of a seminary and the creation of a catechism with help from the Jesuits. The Mechelen Catechism remained a standard in Catholic religious education in Belgium until well into the twentieth century.

On 14 November 1599 he installed Joanne Berkeley as the first abbess of a new Benedictine convent in Brussels. The new convent had been approved by the pope and the local authorities and it was funded by Mary Percy who was one of the first nuns.

In 1607, Hovius convened a provincial council in Mechelen to implement the decrees of the Council of Trent in the archdiocese. After an official enquiry, in 1604, Hovius approved the cult of Our Lady of Scherpenheuvel, In 1606, the newly constructed shrine received a papal indulgence. He also promoted the veneration of the Martyrs of Gorkum. He was supported in his efforts by Albert and Isabella of Austria, Governors-General of the Spanish Netherlands.

Archbishop Hovius died on 30 May 1620 during a canonical visitation to Affligem Abbey.

Catholic Church titles
Preceded by Joannes Hauchin	3rd Archbishop of Mechelen; 1596–1620	Succeeded by Jacobus Boonen
