= Mary Knatchbull =

English abbess (1610–1696)

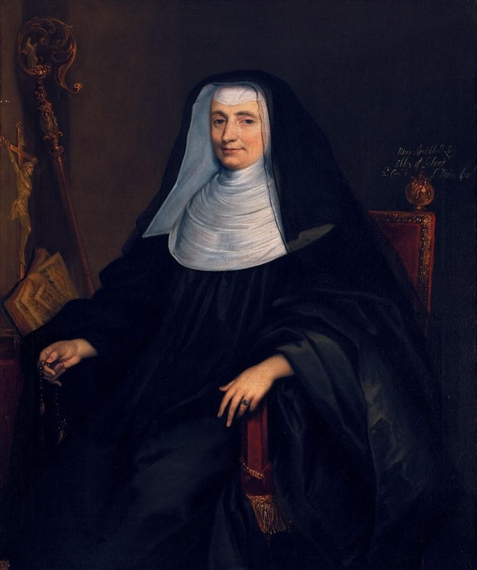
- by John Michael Wright
- Born: 1610; Kingdom of England
- Died: March 6, 1696 (aged 85–86); Ghent
- Occupation: nun
- Known for: Abbess at Ghent

Mary Knatchbull (1610 – 6 March 1696) was abbess of the Convent of the Immaculate Conception in Ghent in what is now Belgium. Knatchbull tried to handle the convent's large debts which she inherited, but her plans were thwarted when Charles II of England borrowed money, promising its return, but failing to pay back the full amount to the convent after The Restoration.

== Life ==
Knatchbull was born in the Kingdom of England in 1610. When she was about fourteen she was amongst the founding members of a new Convent of the Immaculate Conception in Ghent. The convent was created by her aunt Lucy Knatchbull in 1624. The convent was founded by nuns from the Brussels convent and the original four were her aunt, Magdalen Digby, Eugenia Poulton and Mary Roper. Another of the early nuns, Margaret Knatchbull, her sister, was also a niece of the abbess. The convent grew rapidly gathering new members and funds from their dowries. Her aunt led the group and she commissioned a new building on the banks of the River Scheldt which they moved to in 1628.

She rose through the ranks. Her aunt died in 1629, and by the time she was elected abbess in 1640 there was £6,000 of debt. She tackled this in two ways, firstly she reduced the convent's expenditure, but she also renegotiated the convent's debts to spread and reduce the payments necessary to service the loans.

Meanwhile the exiled Charles II was in Europe and Knatchbull enjoyed a close relationship with the King and his court. The convent played host to the court and received and passed on letters to the King's advisers including the Earl of Ormonde and Edward Hyde (later earl of Clarendon). Knatchbull communicated widely and her opinions were noted. She was considered one of the finest of abbesses and a person who played an important role in Charles II's restoration to the throne in 1660. When Charles left to return to England her called in to see the nuns. He owed them over £3,000. He gave them a token payment and reaffirmed his intention to settle his debts with thanks once her was restored to the monarchy. Knatchbull never saw the £3,000, but she did manage to obtain £1,000 after twice travelling to London to remind the new King of his debt to the nuns of Ghent. Knatchbull died in Ghent in 1696.
