= Elizabeth Knatchbull =

English abbess

- Born: 1584
- Died: 5 August 1629 (aged 44–45); Ghent

Elizabeth Knatchbull (religious name Lucy) (1584 – 5 August 1629) was the founding English abbess of the Convent of the Immaculate Conception in Ghent.

== Life ==
Knatchnull was born in 1584. Her parents were Ann Elizabeth (born Crispe) and Reginald Knatchbull of Saltwood Castle.

In 1604 she joined the English Benedictine convent in Brussels in 1604 and was professed seven years later when she was given the religious name of Lucy. She would write of the anguish she felt at the commitment she had made but in time she took the idea of being a nun joyously.

In 1608 Mary Lovel became a nun at the English Benedictine convent in Brussels. She left the convent in 1609 as the prioress Joanne Berkeley did not agree with her view about confessors being Jesuits. Berkeley had wanted to found a new convent to house difficult nuns such as Lovel, but she could not get permission. Berkeley had decided to ban Jesuit special assistants at confession and this caused Lovel, Knatchbull and Elizabeth/Magdelan Digby to leave. Another sister interceded for the prioress and Knatchbull and Digby returned in 1609 - but not Lovel.

By 1624 she felt crowded at the convent in Brussels and she was given leave to go to Ghent with three other nuns to establish a small convent there. The four nuns were Knatchbull, Magdalen Digby, Eugenia Poulton, Mary Lovel/Roper. Two of the early nuns were her nieces Mary and Margaret Knatchbull. Within a year they had twenty postulants and the dowries that these recruits bought to the convent. With these funds Knatchnull was able to commission a new building on the banks of the River Scheldt which they moved to in 1628.

After the Civil War broke out in 1640, the Catholic convert Tobie Matthew was falsely accused. Matthew, by now in his sixties, left England in 1641. He took refuge with the English Jesuits at their house at Ghent. Whilst he was there he became the spiritual adviser to Knatchbull. He admired her and wrote her biography, The life of Lady Lucy Knatchbull, that was first published in 1931.

== Death and legacy ==
Knatchbull died in Ghent on 5 August 1629. In 1650 Knatchbull's niece Mary was elected Abbess. The Ghent community had to flee to the UK in 1794 and they initially settled in Preston, moving to Caverswall Castle and then to Oulton in 1853 where it continues.
