= Cæsar Clement =

English Catholic prelate

Caesar Clement (1561–1626) was a Catholic priest of English descent in the Habsburg Netherlands.

== Life ==
Caesar was born in Leuven (now Belgium), the illegitimate son of Thomas Clement and so the grandson of Thomas More's friend John Clement. He was a student at the English College, Douai, in 1578 when the college moved to Reims. Shortly thereafter, he was sent to the English College, Rome, where he was admitted 5 September 1579. He was ordained priest in the Lateran Basilica on 7 September 1586, with dispensation for illegitimacy, and left Rome in October 1587. Initially intending to travel to England, after arriving at Rheims on 1 December he instead went to his father in Flanders.

In 1589 Clement was awarded a royal pension in the Habsburg Netherlands and in 1595 was appointed chaplain to the court in Brussels. In 1598 he visited Spain and Italy. Within the next few years he was appointed a protonotary apostolic and vicar general of the Army of Flanders.

He became a canon of Brussels Minster in 1607, and dean of the chapter in 1617.

He was a generous benefactor to English Catholic exiles, especially the Augustinian Canonesses of Louvain. In 1612 he carried out a canonical visitation of the English College, Douai, along with Robert Chambers.

Clement died in Brussels, on 28 August 1626.

== Publications ==
- Philip Numan, Historia de los milagros, translated by Caesar Clement (Brussels, 1606)
