= Joannes Hauchin =

- Archbishop of Mechelen
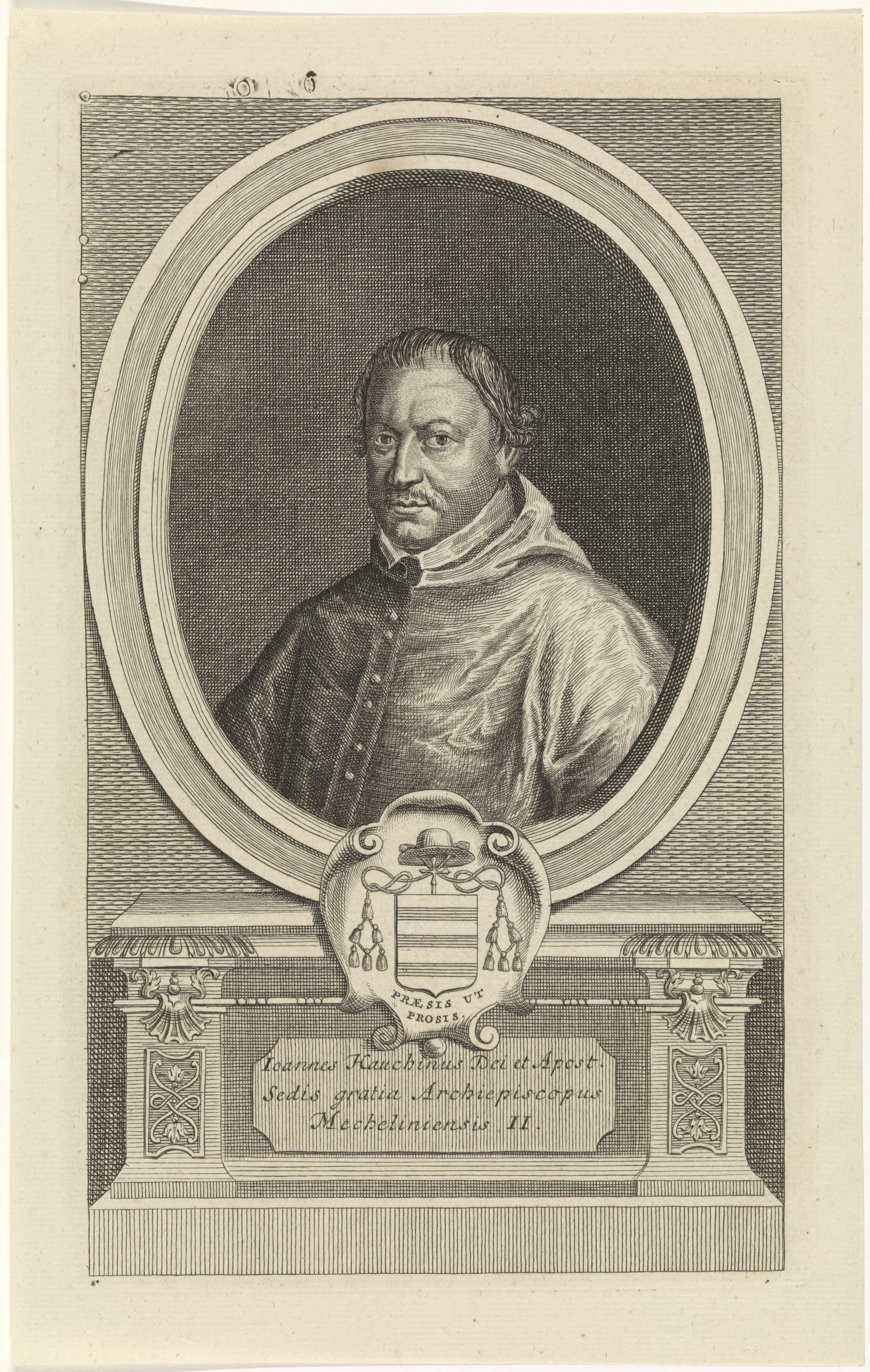
- Jan Baptist Jongelinck's engraving of a portrait of Joannes Hauchin. Published in Cornelis van Gestel, Historia sacra et profana archiepiscopatus Mechliniensis (1725)
- Church: Roman Catholic
- Archdiocese: Mechelen
- See: St. Rumbold's Cathedral
- Installed: 1585
- Term ended: 1589
- Predecessor: Antoine Perrenot de Granvelle
- Successor: Mathias Hovius

Orders
- Consecration: 30 October 1583

Personal details
- Born: 1527 Geraardsbergen
- Died: 5 January 1589 (aged 61–62)
- Buried: St. Rumbold's Cathedral
- Education: University of Leuven; Douai University
- Motto: Praesis ut prosis

Joannes Hauchin (1527 – 1589) was the second Archbishop of Mechelen from 1583 to 1589. His term as Archbishop was marked by the disturbances attendant on the Dutch Revolt.

== Early life ==
Born at Geraardsbergen, Hauchin studied philosophy at Leuven University and theology at the University of Dole and the University of Douai, where he graduated Licentiate of Sacred Theology. He was chaplain to William the Silent and in 1571 dean of Brussels minster. On 23 February 1580, the city council of Brussels (then Calvinist) ordered him, as vicar general of the diocese, to publish a decree suppressing feastdays of saints, which he refused to do. On 7 May 1580 he took part in a public disputation with Calvinists about the nature of the Eucharist. After other clashes with the civic authorities, he spent three months in prison.

== Archbishop ==
On 30 October 1583 he was consecrated archbishop of Mechelen at Tournai (Mechelen itself then being in rebel hands). He entered his see in 1585. On 8 November 1585, the remnants of the relics of St Rumbold of Mechelen, saved from the desecration of the cathedral during the period of Calvinist rule, were solemnly deposited in the saint's tomb in the cathedral.

In 1588 he had the Pastorale Mechliniense, commissioned from the theologians of Leuven University, published by Christophe Plantin in Antwerp. This was a handbook of the rites to be used by priests throughout the ecclesiastical province.

Archbishop Hauchin died on 5 January 1589.

Catholic Church titles
Preceded by Antoine Perrenot de Granvelle	2nd Archbishop of Mechelen; 1596–1589	Succeeded by Mathias Hovius
