= Testelt =

- Location in Belgium
- Coordinates: 51°00′N 4°57′E
- Country: Belgium
- Region: Flemish Region
- Community: Flemish Community
- Province: Flemish Brabant
- Municipality: Scherpenheuvel-Zichem
- Postal codes: 3272
- Area codes: 013

Testelt is a village in Belgium, part of the municipality Scherpenheuvel-Zichem. It has a population of 2,877 (2006 est.).
