= Basilica of Our Lady of Scherpenheuvel =

Church in Scherpenheuvel-Zichem, Belgium

Basilica of Our Lady of Scherpenheuvel Basiliek van Onze-Lieve-Vrouw van Scherpenheuvel (in Dutch) Basilique de Notre Dame de Montaigu (in French)
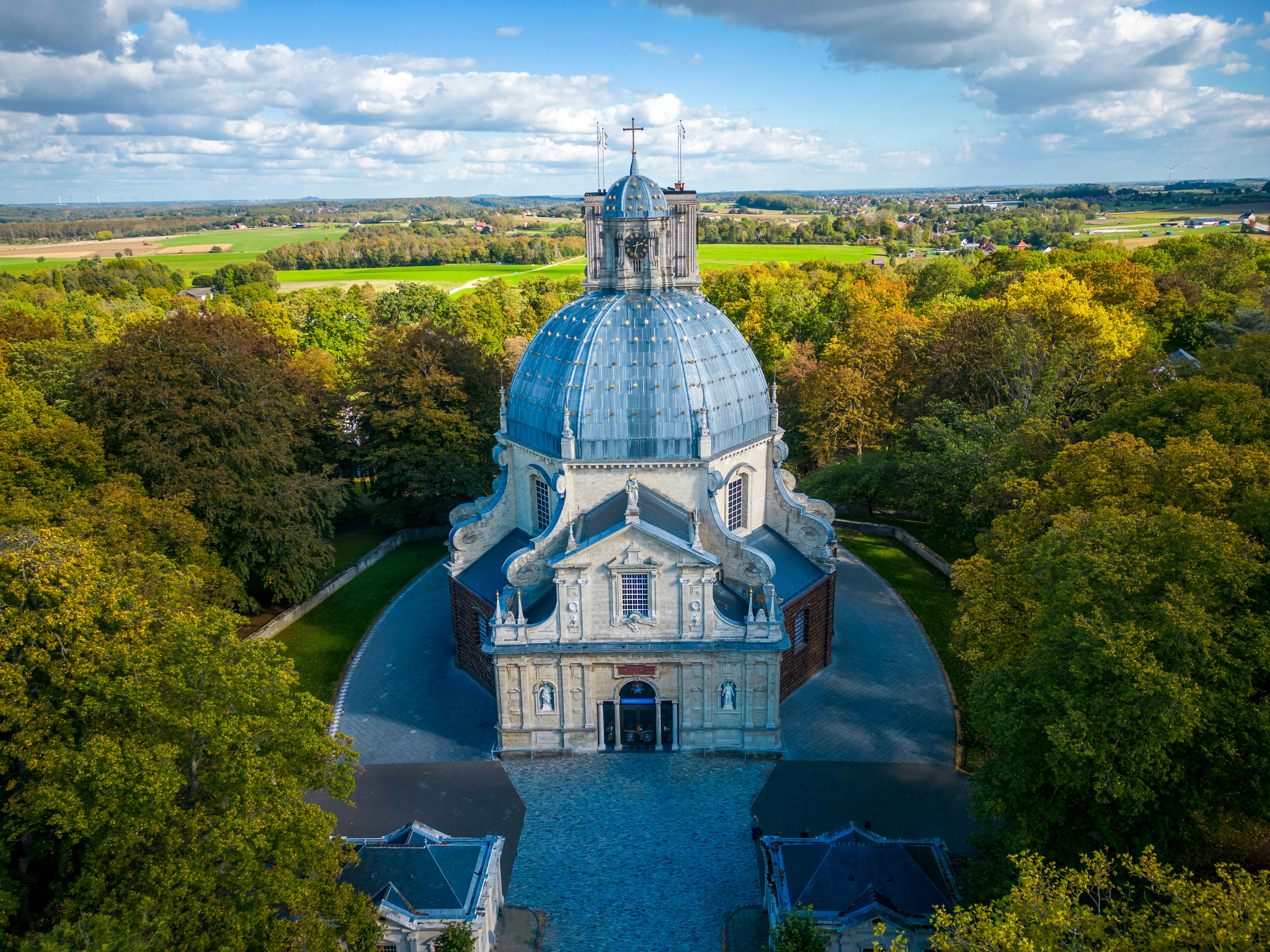

Religion
- Affiliation: Roman Catholic
- Leadership: Luc Van Hilst
- Year consecrated: 1627
- Status: Active

Location
- Location: Scherpenheuvel-Zichem, Belgium
- Municipality: Scherpenheuvel-Zichem
- Interactive map of Basilica of Our Lady of Scherpenheuvel; Basiliek van Onze-Lieve-Vrouw van Scherpenheuvel (in Dutch); Basilique de Notre Dame de Montaigu (in French)
- Coordinates: 50°58′49″N 4°58′42″E

Architecture
- Architect: Wenceslas Cobergher
- Type: Parish church, minor basilica
- Style: Baroque
- Groundbreaking: 1609

The Basilica of Our Lady of Scherpenheuvel (Dutch: Basiliek van Onze-Lieve-Vrouw van Scherpenheuvel; French: Basilique de Notre Dame de Montaigu) is a Roman Catholic parish church and minor basilica in Scherpenheuvel-Zichem, Belgium. The church was consecrated in 1627 and raised to the status of a minor basilica in 1922. It is reputedly the most frequently visited shrine of pilgrimage in Belgium. While the cult on the Scherpenheuvel (or Sharp Hill) is older, its present architectural layout and its enduring importance are due to the patronage of the Archdukes Albert and Isabella and the Counter-Reformation.

== Origins ==
For many years the Marian cult on the Scherpenheuvel centered on a small statue of the Virgin Mary that hung in an oak tree on top of the hill. According to the foundation legend a shepherd noticed that the image had fallen to the ground and decided to take it home. When he had lifted it, he discovered he was unable to move. As the herd did not return in the evening, his master got worried and went to look for the shepherd. Only by restoring the statue to its original place in the oak tree could the master release the shepherd, thereby discovering the spiritual importance of the site. The veracity of this story is impossible to ascertain. It is however clear that the inhabitants of the nearby town of Zichem would frequent the site in the second half of the sixteenth century whenever a member of the family suffered from illness. They would traditionally walk round the tree three times while praying.

Zichem was part of the barony of Diest, a possession of the House of Orange-Nassau. In the course of the Dutch Revolt the barony changed hands several times. While occupied by forces of the United Provinces between 1580 and 1583, the statue was removed in an act of iconoclasm. After the town was retaken by Alexander Farnese, the parishioners of Zichem restored the cult in 1587. It was later claimed that they did so after discovering the original statue and returning it to the tree. From then on the cult of Our Lady of Scherpenheuvel began to expand. Soldiers and almoners of the Army of Flanders that were stationed in nearby Diest or Zichem helped to spread its reputation.

== Development of the shrine ==
After an official enquiry, Mathias Hovius, Archbishop of Mechelen, approved the cult of Scherpenheuvel in 1604. The approval was accompanied by the publication of a collection of miracles ascribed to the intercession of the Virgin of Scherpenheuvel in Dutch, French and Spanish. An English translation followed in 1606. Philip Numan, who had authored the collection, produced two more editions (1605 and 1606) as well as three more collections (1613–1614, 1617 and 1617–1618) in short succession. Latin versions were published by the famous humanists Justus Lipsius (1605) and Erycius Puteanus (1622). Lesser authors would produce continuations up to 1706. According to these publications, close to 700 miracles were credited to the intercession of Our Lady of Scherpenheuvel in the course of the seventeenth century. The Latin collections in particular caused a lot of controversy among theologians, with Calvinist authors ridiculing the whole idea of miraculous intercession by saints.

Meanwhile, it had been decided in 1602 to remove the statue from the oak tree and house it in a small wooden chapel nearby. Within the year the chapel proved too small and was replaced by a modest stone edifice. Its foundation stone was laid on 13 July 1603 by Count Frederik van den Bergh on behalf of the Archdukes Albert and Isabella. From that point on the Archdukes showed great interest in the development of the shrine. Attributing the recent relief of the besieged town of 's-Hertogenbosch to the intercession of the Virgin, Albert and Isabella made their first pilgrimage to Scherpenheuvel on 20 November 1603. It would soon become a yearly pilgrimage that took place in May or June and lasted the nine days of a novena.

Under the patronage of the Archdukes, the emerging shrine was raised to the status of a town in 1605 and of an independent parish in 1610. Their support helped to ensure the grant of a papal indulgence on 16 September 1606, the feast of Our Lady of Sorrows. In the previous summer the stone chapel was surrounded by a closed garden or Hortus Conclusus in the shape of a heptagon. Shortly after reaching a cease-fire with the United Provinces, Albert and Isabella announced on 28 April 1607 that they would build a vast church and surround it with a planned and fortified town. The foundation stone of the third and present church was laid by them in person on 2 July 1609, the feast of the Visitation.

With the bell tower left unfinished, the church was dedicated by Archbishop Jacobus Boonen in June 1627. In order to ensure that a sufficient number of priests would be available to meet the needs of the ever growing number of pilgrims, the shrine was handed over to the Oratorians. They built a convent behind the church and connected the two buildings with a long corridor. The Oratorians took care of the sanctuary until the French Republic annexed the Austrian Netherlands and dissolved all monasteries. The church then returned to the status of a parish church.

== Architecture and decoration of the basilica ==
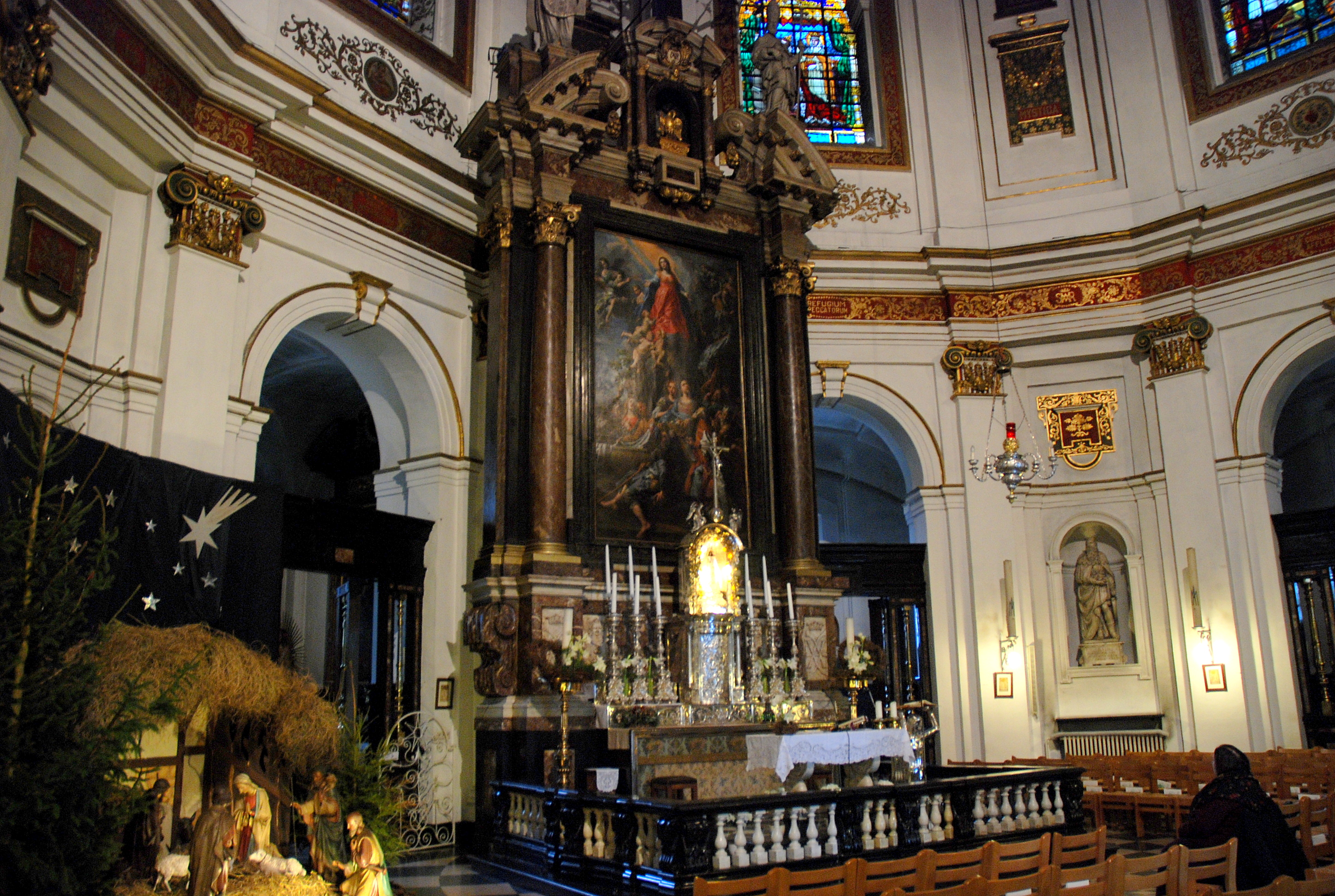
Interior of the basilica

The archducal architect and engineer Wenceslas Cobergher is generally credited with designing the church and staking out the general outlay of the town of Scherpenheuvel. Both the church and the town are in fact determined by the Hortus Conclusus in the shape of a heptagon. The basilica is a central and domed structure, resting on seven columns. The main altar stands on the site of the oak tree. It is surrounded on six sides by chapels. The seventh side opens on to the vestibule, that is flanked by two more chapels. The side chapels are connected with an ambulatory, that enables pilgrims to walk round without entering the central space. On the opposite side of the vestibule stands the unfinished bell tower. Underneath the tower and on the outer walls are seven more altars. One of the most striking features of the exterior are the hundreds of seven-pointed gilded stars that cover the surface of the dome. The overall design of the church shows a lot of resemblance with the iconic but posterior (1631-1681) basilica of Santa Maria della Salute in Venice.

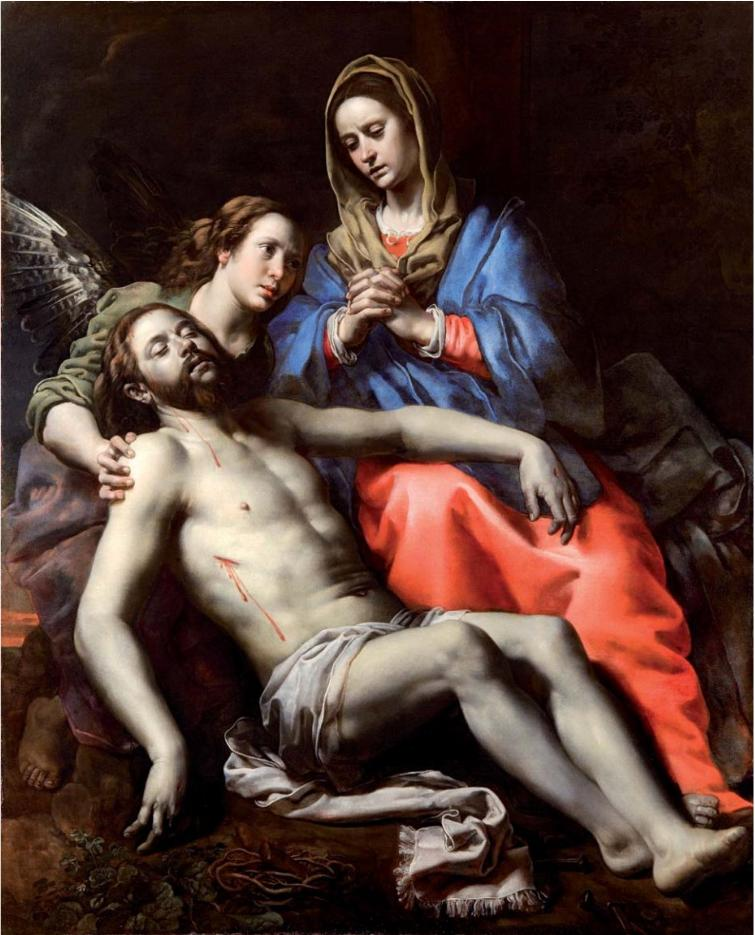
The Lamentation of Christ by Theodoor van Loon

The main altar and six side-altars are decorated with altarpieces by Theodoor van Loon. They represent seven scenes from the life of the Virgin. The Encounter at the Golden Gate, serving as a depiction of the Immaculate Conception, the Birth of the Virgin, the Presentation of the Virgin, the Annunciation, the Visitation and the Presentation of Jesus at the Temple feature in the side chapels. The altarpiece of the main altar depicts the Assumption of the Virgin. A number of other paintings adorn the basilica, one of which is Theodoor van Loon's Lamentation of Christ. The statuary is by the sculptors de Nole and features the six statues of prophets on the columns in the central space of the basilica, four seated evangelists in the vestibule, as well as the two archangels flanking the main entrance.

The iconographical program of the basilica is particularly rich. The recurrent use of the number seven (in the shape of the church and the town, the number of altars outside and inside, the shape of the stars on the dome) recalls the cult of the Seven Sorrows of the Virgin. Building on a tradition dating from the late fifteenth century, Our Lady of Sorrows was considered the protectress of the unity of the Burgundian Netherlands. Built at a time that legitimate rule over the Low Countries was disputed between the monarchical and Catholic Southern Netherlands and the republican and Calvinist United Provinces, the cult of Our Lady of Sorrows harkened back to the days of political and religious unity.

On a further level, the iconography of the basilica develops a defense of the doctrine of the Immaculate Conception by employing a series of Marian emblems from the litanies. Thus the seven columns on which the dome rests, refer to the seven columns of the House of Wisdom or Domus sapientiae in Proverbs 9:1. With its archangels standing guard and side-altars dedicated to All Saints and All Angels, the entrance and vestibule constitute the Gateway to Heaven or Porta Caeli. The bell tower evokes the Tower of David or Turris Davidica from which one could supposedly see Shechem (or in the case of Scherpenheuvel Zichem/Sichem). Other such emblems include the Jacob's Ladder or Scala Jacob, the Ark of the Covenant or Arca Testamenti, the Strong City or Urbs Fortitudinis and of course the Closed Garden or Hortus Conclusus.

== Distinctions granted to the basilica ==
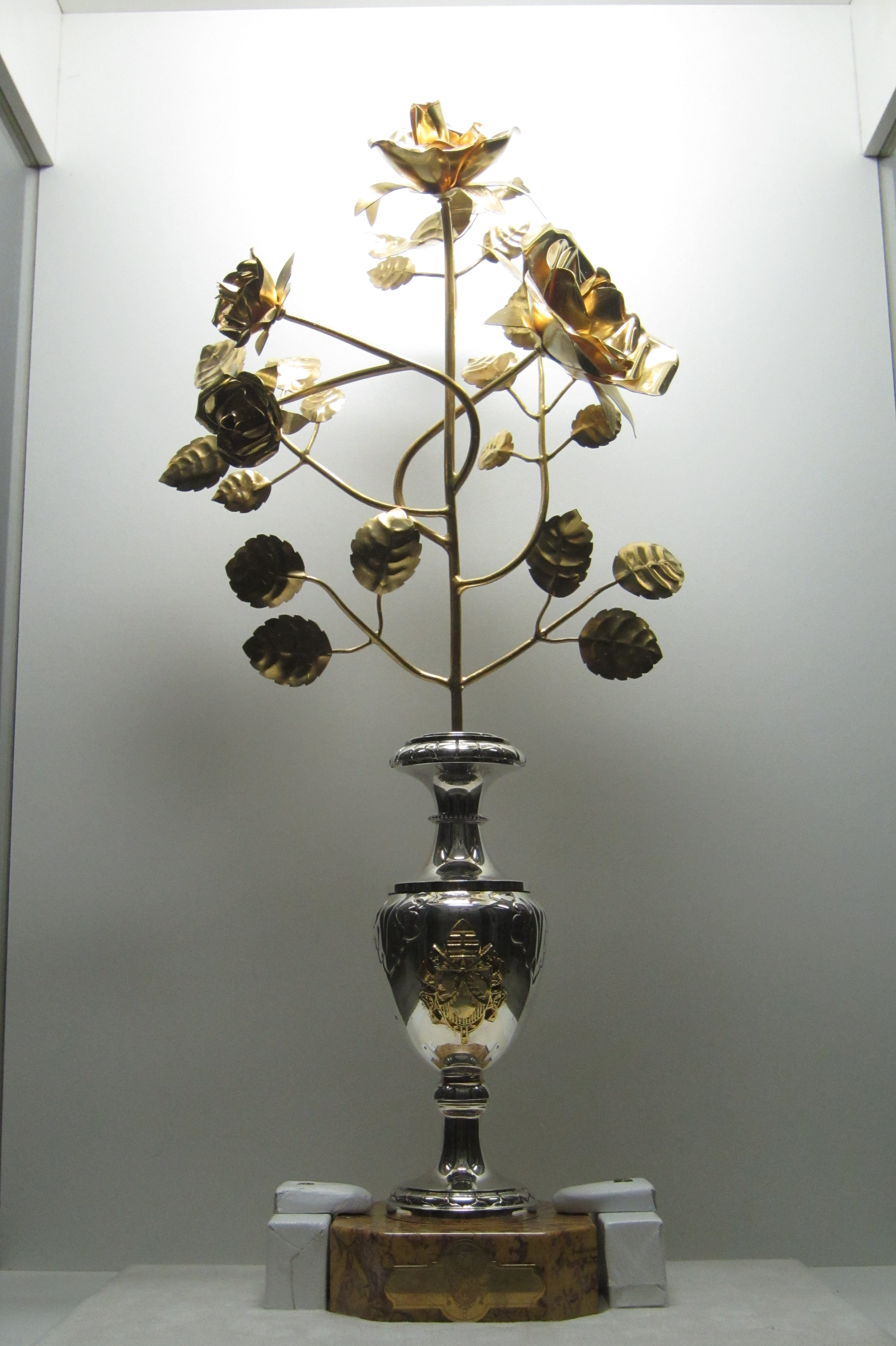
Golden Rose of the Basilica of Our Lady of Scherpenheuvel

The image of Our Lady of Scherpenheuvel was solemnly crowned by Cardinal Victor-Auguste-Isidor Deschamps on behalf of Pope Pius IX on 25 August 1872.

Fifty years later, Pope Pius XI raised the shrine to the status of a minor basilica on 2 May 1922.

On 2 February 2011 Pope Benedict XVI dedicated that year's Golden Rose to the basilica. It was ceremoniously presented by the Papal nuncio Monsigneur Giacinto Berloco on 15 May 2011 with grand Pontifical ceremony.

== Traditional devotional practices ==
The pilgrimage season runs from 1 May to the first week of November. In 2010 almost 1200 groups of pilgrims visited the shrine, with parties traveling from as far as Soest in the Netherlands and Fulda in Germany. Over the centuries many parishes or even towns adopted the practice of a collective pilgrimage. Quite a few have survived until today. Probably the best known is De Grote Trek that covers the 57 km from Antwerp to Scherpenheuvel and has been held on every first Sunday of May since 1931. Pilgrims that have made journey on foot 25 or 50 times are traditionally entitled to a special blessing with the statue of Our Lady of Scherpenheuvel.

On the Sunday after All Hallows the statue of the Virgin is carried round the basilica in the Kaarskensprocessie or Procession of Candles. It takes its name from the numerous candles that are lit by the faithful as the statue passes by. Every 25 years the crowning of the statue of Our Lady of Scherpenheuvel is commemorated with great solemnity in what are known as the Kroningsfeesten. They were last held in 1997.

== Spread of the cult of Our Lady of Scherpenheuvel ==
Even before the official approbation of the cult of Our Lady of Scherpenheuvel, pilgrims took particles of the oak tree with them as pious souvenirs. Several stories of miracles attributed to the intercession by the Virgin relate of the thaumaturgic power of this Scherpenheuvel or Montague wood. Following the approbation, Archbishop Hovius ordered the tree to be cut down. It was divided in several parts. Some remained with the sanctuary; one particularly large piece was given to Albert and Isabella. Most of this Montague wood was used to make images of the Virgin Mary. Distributed as gifts among princes, nobles and clergy, they helped to disseminate the cult of Scherpenheuvel.

Quite a few Belgian churches and convents came to possess an image carved in Montague wood. Well known examples remain in the Church of St. Charles Borromeo in Antwerp, the Church of St. Hilonius in Izegem and the chapel of the Capuchins in Enghien. In the Grand Duchy of Luxembourg, the statue of the national patron saint, Our Lady Comforter of the Afflicted or Our Lady of Luxembourg, is believed to contain Montague wood. A smallish statue of the Virgin and Child in Montague wood was taken by St. Marguerite Bourgeoys to Montreal and stands presently on her tomb in the Notre-Dame-de-Bon-Secours Chapel.

Some places of worship became closely associated with the cult of Scherpenheuvel. In the vicinity of their château of Mariemont, Albert and Isabella founded the priory of Montaigu in the present day municipality of Morlanwelz. In the town of Gray a statue of the Virgin made out of Montague wood became the object of a regional devotion. Likewise in the Franche-Comté, the statue donated to the priory of Bellefontaine in Brussey came to attract many pilgrims. In the proximity of the Spanish Court, the Convent of Las Descalzas Reales obtained an altar dedicated to Nuestra Señora de Monteagudo.

The House of Lorraine had a particular devotion for Scherpenheuvel. Cardinal Charles of Lorraine, prince-bishop of Strasbourg, founded a chapel dedicated to Our Lady of Scherpenheuvel in the noviciate of the Jesuits at Nancy. After his death in 1607, his sister Antoinette completed the project with an altarpiece depicting the ducal family venerating Our Lady of Scherpenheuvel. The chapel served as the repository of the embalmed hearts of the members of the House of Lorraine until 1720. The cult was also greatly favored by the French Queen Marie de' Medici. During her regency, the Discalced Augustinians obtained a statue in Montague wood at their church of Notre-Dame-des-Victoires. During her exile, she donated one statue in Montague wood to the city council of Cologne and another to the monastery of the Discalced Carmelites of that city. While serving the Catholic household of her daughter, Queen Henrietta Maria, the Queen's Chapel of St James's Palace likewise had an altar with a Madonna in Montague wood.

== See also ==
- 17th-century Western domes
- List of carillons in Belgium
- List of Catholic churches in Belgium

== Sources ==
- Numan, Philips (1606). Miracles lately wrought by the intercession of the glorious Virgin Mary at Mont-Aigu in Brabant. Arnold Conings.
- Pallemaerts, Jan Frans (1934–1936). Onze-Lieve-Vrouw van Scherpenheuvel. Ryckmans.
- Boni, Armand (1953). Scherpenheuvel: Basiliek en gemeente in het kader van de vaderlandse geschiedenis. Standaard.
- Lantin, A. (1971). Scherpenheuvel oord van vrede: Ontstaan van de bedevaartplaats: Beschrijving van koepelkerk en kunstschatten. Kempische boekhandel.
- Meganck, Tine (1998). De kerkelijke architectuur von Wensel Cobergher (1557/61-1634) in het licht van zijn verblijf in Rome. Koninklijke Academie voor Wetenschappen, Letteren en Schone Kunsten van België. ISBN 978-90-6569-675-5.
- Duerloo, Luc; Wingens, Marc (2002). Scherpenheuvel: Het Jeruzalem van de Lage Landen. Davidsfonds. ISBN 90-5826-182-4.
- Delsalle, Paul (2005). "La diffusion en Franche-Comté des statuettes de la Vierge de Montaigu (Brabant) à l'époque des archiducs Albert et Isabelle, 1598-1633". In Béthouart, Bruno (ed.). La dévotion mariale de l'an mil à nos jours. Artois presses université. pp. 99–124. ISBN 2-84832-021-4.
- Van Wyhe, Cordula (2007). "Reformulating the Cult of Our Lady of Scherpenheuvel: Marie de'Médicis and the Regina Pacis Statue in Cologne, 1635–1645". The Seventeenth Century. 22. Manchester University Press: 42–75. doi:10.1080/0268117X.2007.10555586. ISSN 0268-117X. S2CID 219541628.
- Duerloo, Luc (2008). "Scherpenheuvel-Montaigu: Un sanctuaire pour une politique emblématique". 17ème siècle. 60. Société d'étude du 17ème siècle: 423–439. doi:10.3917/dss.083.0423. ISSN 0012-4273.
