= Philip Numan =

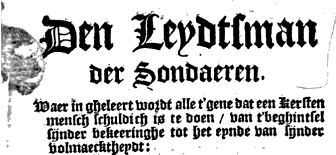
- Part of the frontispiece to Den Leydtsman der Sondaren, Numan's translation of a work by Luis de Granada
- Born: around 1550; Brussels
- Died: 19 February 1627; Brussels
- Citizenship: Brussels
- Occupation: secretary to the city of Brussels
- Writing career
- Pen name: Hippophilus Neander
- Language: Dutch, French, Latin
- Period: Baroque

Philip Numan (born around 1550, died 19 February 1627) was a lawyer and humanist from the Low Countries, and a writer in prose and verse, sometimes under the pen name Hippophilus Neander.

== Life ==
Numan was appointed city secretary of Brussels in 1583, and planned the joyous entries into the city of Archduke Ernest of Austria in 1594 and of Albert VII, Archduke of Austria in 1596.

His account of the miracles attributed to the intercession of Our Lady of Scherpenheuvel was published in Dutch and French, and soon translated into Spanish and English.

He translated a number of Latin and Spanish works into Dutch (and in one case into French). When he was translating Diva Virgo Hallensis by Justus Lipsius, Lipsius wrote to him on 9 April 1605 that he should not translate too literally, but in his own natural style, because "each language has its own character and as it were its own genius, which cannot be conveyed in another language". In preliminary verses to Richard Verstegan's Neder-duytsche epigrammen (Mechelen, Henry Jaye, 1617) Numan wrote in praise of the "genius" of Dutch as a literary language.

== Works ==
=== As author ===
- Den Spiegel der Menschen, innehoudende den generalen staet ende roep van t'menschelijck gheslachte. Antwerp, Hans Coesmans, 1583.
- Den Strijt des gemoets inden wech der deuchden. Brussels, Jan Mommaert, 1590.
- Descriptio Spectaculorum et Ludorum in adventu Sereniss. Principis Ernesti Austriaci Bruxellis editorum. Antwerp, Christopher Plantin, 1595. This work on a Joyous Entry of Archduke Ernest of Austria to Brussels was illustrated by Johannes Bochius and Joos de Momper.
- Panegyricus in adventum serenissimorum principum, Alberti et Isabellae, Archiducum Austriae, Ducum Brabantiae, in civitatem Bruxellensem. Brussels, Jan Mommaert, 1599.
- Historie vande Mirakelen die onlancx in grooten getale gebeurt zyn, door die intercessie ende voor-bidden van die H. Maget Maria. Op een plaetse ghenoemt Scherpenheuvel by die stadt van Sichen in Brabandt. 2nd edition. Leuven, Jan Baptist Zangre, 1604. Further edition Brussels, Rutger Velpius, 1606. Augmented edition 1614.
- Histoire des Miracles advenuz n'agueres a l'intercession de la Glorieuse Vierge Marie, au lieu dit Mont-aigu, prez de Sichen, au Duché de Brabant. 2nd edition. Brussels, Rutger Velpius, 1605. Augmented edition 1613. On the Marian cult of the Basilica of Our Lady of Scherpenheuvel.
  - Spanish translation as Historia de los Milagros que en Nuestra Señora de Monteagudo çerca de Sichen, en el Ducado de Brabante, nuestro Señor ha sido servido de obrar by Cæsar Clement. Brussels, Rutger Velpius, 1606.
  - English translation as Miracles lately wrought by the intercession of the Glorious Virgin Mary at Mont-aigu, nere unto Sichen in Brabant, by Robert Chambers (Antwerp, Arnout Coninx, 1606)
- Toe-voechsele vanden Mirakelen gheschiedt op Scherpen-heuvel. Brussels, Hubert Anthoon, 1617.
- Ander mirakelen van onse lieve vrouwe op Scherpenheuvel. Brussels, Hubert Anthoon, 1617.
- Autres Miracles de Nostre Dame au Mont-Aigu. Brussels, Hubert Anthoon, 1618.

=== As translator ===
- Louis of Granada, Den Leydtsman der Sondaeren. Antwerp, Christopher Plantin, 1588. Further edition 1613.
- Raymond of Capua, Het Leven van de seer heylighe Maghet Catherina van Senen. Brussels, 1594. Reprinted Antwerp, 1638.
- Bernardino da Balbano, Theylich Mysterie van die Gheesselinghe ons Heeren Iesu Christi. Leuven, Jan Maes, 1607. Reprinted 1611.
- Justus Lipsius, Die Heylighe Maghet van Halle. Brussels, Rutger Velpius, 1607. Reprinted 1643.
- Andres de Soto, Deux dialogues traitans de la doctrine & matiere des miracles. Brussels, Rutger Velpius, 1613.
  - Also into Dutch as Twee t'samensprekingen behandelende de leeringe ende materie vanden mirakelen. Brussels, Rutger Velpius, 1614.

== Bibliography ==
- Aa, A.J. van der, Biographisch woordenboek der Nederlanden, volume 13, Haarlem, 1868, pp. 344–345
- Witsen Geysbeek, P.G., Biographisch anthologisch en critisch woordenboek der Nederduitsche dichters, volume 4, Amsterdam, 1822, p. 520
