= Antoine Perrenot de Granvelle =

Burgundian statesman

His Eminence Antoine Perrenot de Granvelle Count of La Baume Saint-Amour
- Cardinal, Archbishop of Besançon
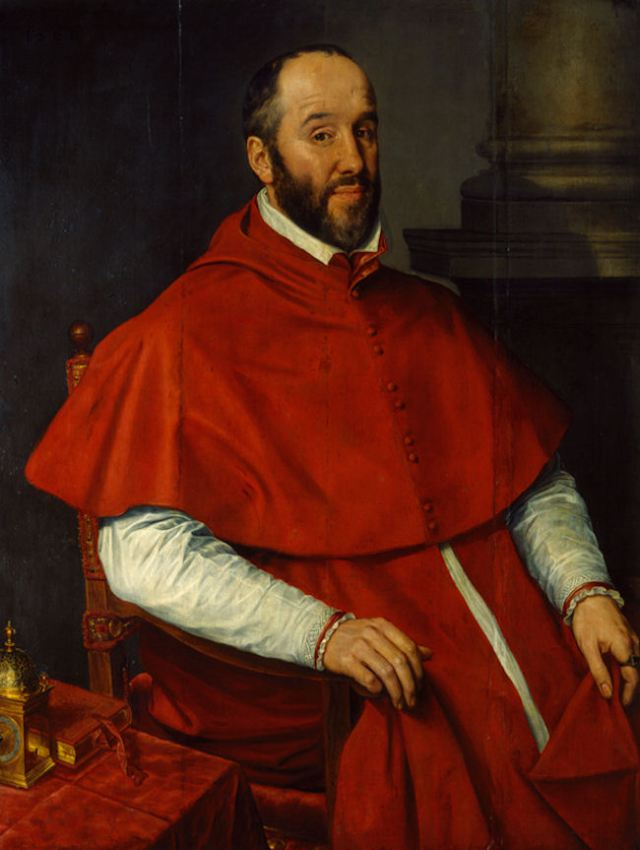
- Portrait by Willem Key
- Archdiocese: Besançon
- Appointed: 25 June 1584
- Term ended: 21 September 1586
- Other post: Cardinal-Bishop of Sabina (1578-1586)
- Previous posts: Archbishop of Mechelen (1561-1583); Bishop of Arras (1538-1561)

Orders
- Ordination: 1540
- Consecration: 21 May 1542 by Juan Pardo de Tavera
- Created cardinal: 26 February 1561 by Pius IV
- Rank: Cardinal-Bishop

Personal details
- Born: 20 August 1517 Ornans, Besançon, Holy Roman Empire
- Died: 21 September 1586 (aged 69) Madrid, Kingdom of Spain
- Motto: Durate
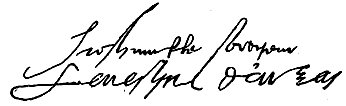
- Signature

- Coat of arms

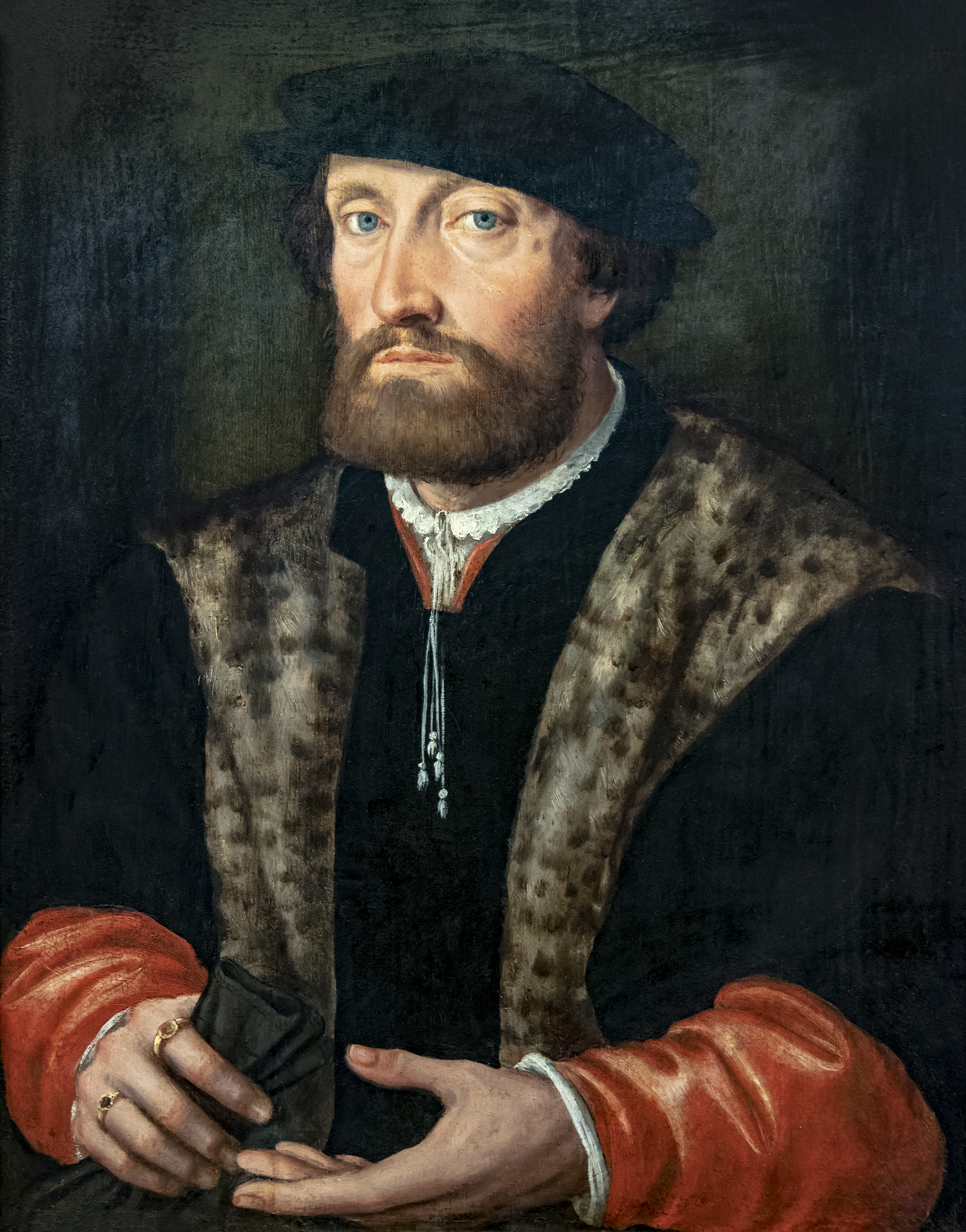
Granvelle, portrait by Frans Floris

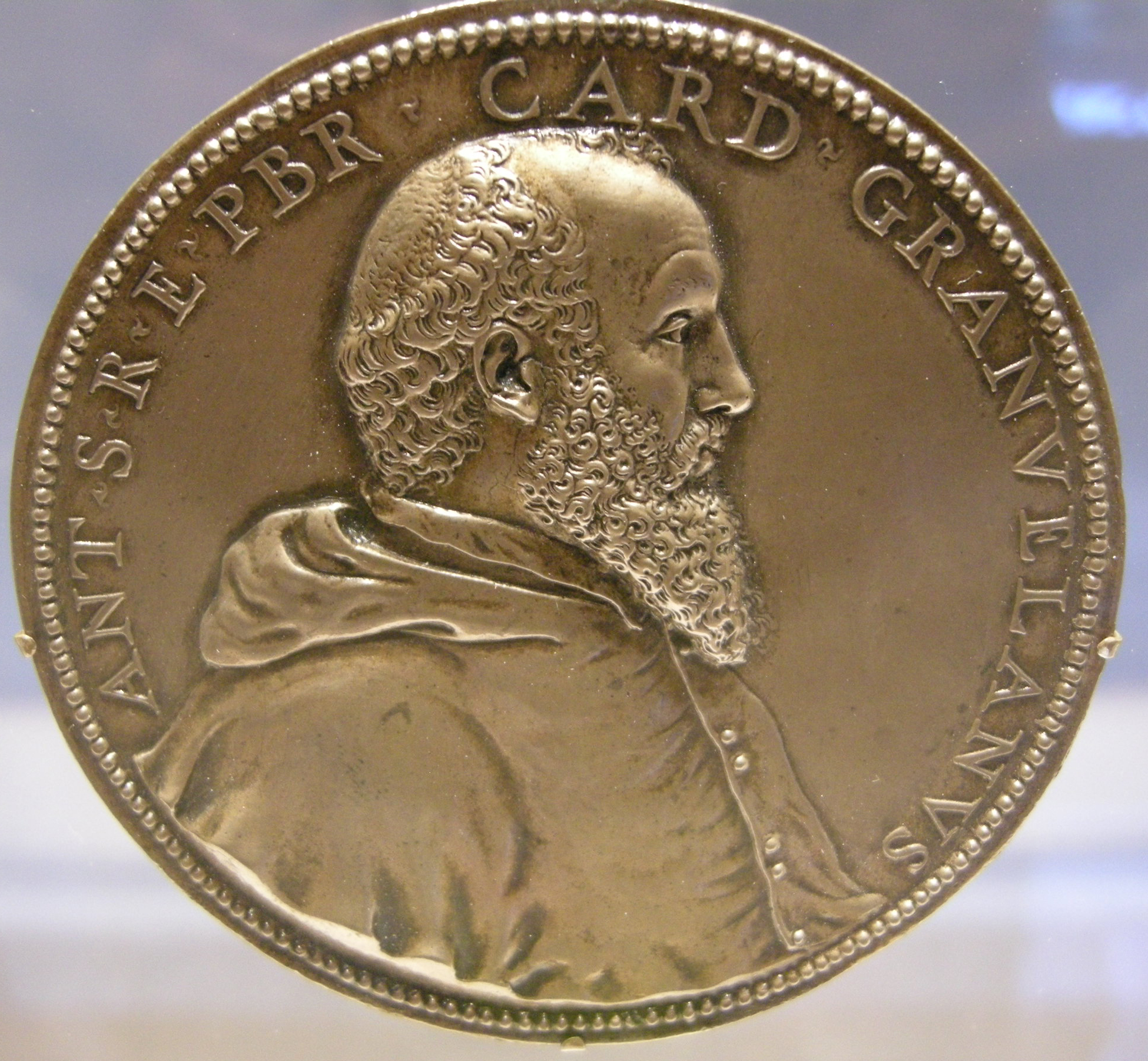
Medal of the cardinal by Jacques Jonghelinck

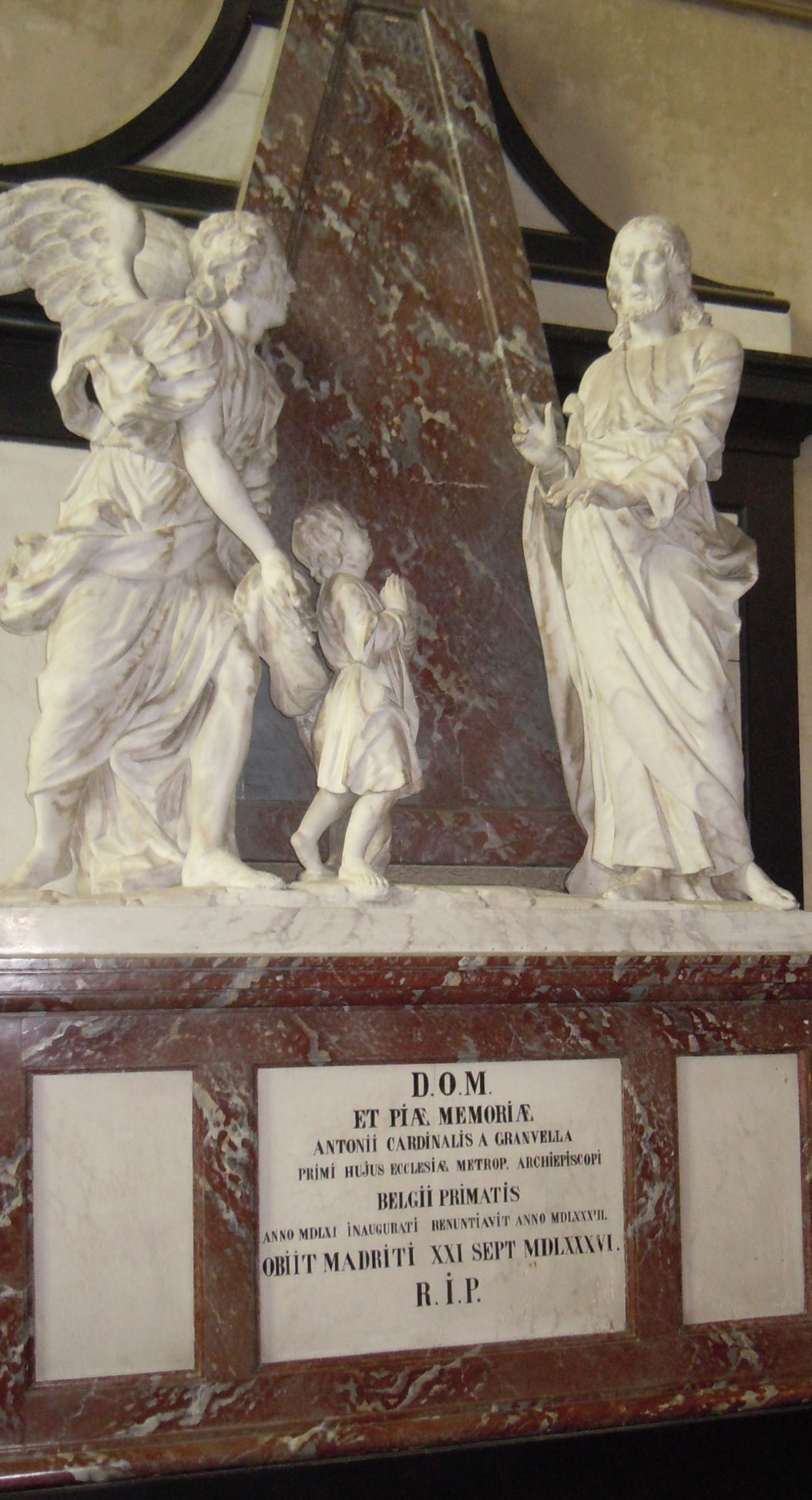
Tomb in Mechelen Cathedral

Antoine Perrenot de Granvelle (20 August 1517 – 21 September 1586), Comte de La Baume Saint Amour, typically known as Cardinal Granvelle in English, was a Burgundian statesman, made a cardinal, who followed his father as a leading minister of the Spanish Habsburgs. Granvelle was one of the most influential European politicians during the time which immediately followed the appearance of Protestantism in Europe; "the dominating Imperial statesman of the whole century". He was also a notable art collector, the "greatest private collector of his time, the friend and patron of Titian and Leoni and many other artists".

== Biography ==
He was born in the Free Imperial City of Besançon, now in France, then a self-governing city surrounded by the Imperial territory of the County of Burgundy (Franche-Comté).

His father, Nicholas Perrenot de Granvelle (1484–1550), afterwards became chancellor of the empire under Charles V, Holy Roman Emperor, held an influential position in the Netherlands, and from 1530 until his death he was one of the emperor's most trusted advisers in Germany. On the completion of his studies in law at Padua and in divinity at Leuven, Antoine held a canonry at Besançon, nowadays in eastern France, then was promoted to the bishopric of Arras with a dispensation due to his age of barely twenty-three (1540). He was ordained into the priesthood in 1540.

In his episcopal capacity he attended several diets of the empire, as well as the opening meetings of the Council of Trent, which he addressed on behalf of Charles V. The influence of his father, now chancellor, led to Granvelle being entrusted with many difficult and delicate pieces of public business. In the execution of these tasks he developed a talent for diplomacy, while at the same time acquiring an intimate acquaintance with most of the currents of European politics. He was involved in the settlement of the terms of peace after the defeat of the Schmalkaldic League at the Battle of Mühlberg in 1547, a settlement in which, to say the least, some particularly sharp practice was exhibited.

In 1550, he succeeded his father in the office of secretary of state; in this capacity he attended Charles in the war with Maurice of Saxony, accompanied him in the flight from Innsbruck, and afterwards drew up the Peace of Passau (August 1552). In the following year he and Simon Renard, the ambassador of Charles V to the Queen Mary I of England, conducted the negotiations for the marriage of Mary and Philip II of Spain. Granvelle transferred his services to Philip in 1555, on the abdication of the emperor, and he was employed by him in the Netherlands.

In April 1559, Granvelle was one of the Spanish signatories for the Treaty of Cateau-Cambrésis, and on Philip's withdrawal from the Netherlands in August of the same year he was surreptitiously appointed chief councillor to the regent Margaret of Parma.

The policy of repression which in this capacity he pursued during the next five years secured for him many tangible rewards: in 1560 he was elevated to the archepiscopal see of Mechelen, and in 1561 he became a cardinal; but the growing hostility of a people whose religious convictions he had set himself to oppose ultimately made it impossible for him to continue in the Netherlands. On the advice of his royal master he retired to Franche-Comté in March 1564.

After a visit to Rome in 1565, in November 1566 he was appointed as member of the Congregation of "Principi", the centre of the Papal States' foreign policy, by Pope Pius V.

In 1570, Granvelle, at the request of Philip, helped to arrange the alliance between the Papacy, Venice and Spain against the Turks, which was responsible for the victory of Lepanto the next year. In the same year he became viceroy of Naples, a post of some difficulty and danger, which for five years he occupied with ability and success. He was summoned to Madrid in 1575 by Philip II to be president of the Council for Italian affairs.

Among the more delicate negotiations of his later years were those of 1580, which had for their object the ultimate union of the crowns of Spain and Portugal, and those of 1584, which resulted in a check to France by the marriage of the Spanish infanta Catherine to Charles Emmanuel I of Savoy. In the same year he was made archbishop of Besançon, but meanwhile he had been stricken with a lingering disease; he was never enthroned, but died at Madrid in 1586. His body was taken to Besançon Cathedral, where his father had been buried. There is a cenotaph in his honor within Saint Rumbold's Cathedral, Mechelen.

== Collector of art ==
Granvelle had a famous art collection, which partly featured the favourite artists of his Habsburg patrons, such as Titian and Leone Leoni, but also included a number of works by Pieter Bruegel, as well as a significant collection inherited from his father.

Bruegel's friend, sculptor Jacques Jonghelinck (brother of Bruegel's biggest patron) had a studio in Granvelle's palace in Brussels. Whilst in the Netherlands, he "discovered" Antonis Mor and introduced him to the Madrid court, and he also patronised Giambologna and arranged his first visit to Italy.

At his death the collection was inherited by his nephew François-Philippe Perrenot de Granvelle Comte de Cantecroix (1559-1606) who was pressured by Rudolf II, the very acquisitive Austrian Habsburg Emperor, to sell the finest pieces to him, which in 1597 he very reluctantly did, protesting that the price offered for thirty-three works was not enough even for six, and less than he had recently refused from Italian Cardinal Odoardo Farnese (1573-1626) for Dürer's Martyrdom of the Ten Thousand alone. The arrangements were handled by Hans von Aachen. Most of these pieces are now in Vienna or Madrid, including Titian's Venus with an Organ-player, Giambologna's copy of the equestrian statue of Marcus Aurelius, tapestries after cartoons by Hieronymus Bosch and a bust of Charles V by Leoni.

Though he was painted by Titian and Mor, more famous than any portrait of Granvelle himself is the portrait of his dwarf and his mastiff by Mor, now at the Musée du Louvre. which perhaps initiated the Spanish tradition of portraits of court dwarfs.

The Flemish Renaissance humanist Justus Lipsius was Granvelle's secretary for a period in Rome. He also corresponded with the composers Lassus and Adrian Willaert. He had a magnificent library, some of which remains at Besançon.

Catholic Church titles
Preceded by New Creation	1st Archbishop of Mechelen until 1586	Succeeded by Joannes Hauchin
