= John Cornelius (priest) =

Irish Roman Catholic priest and martyr

Blessed John Cornelius SJ
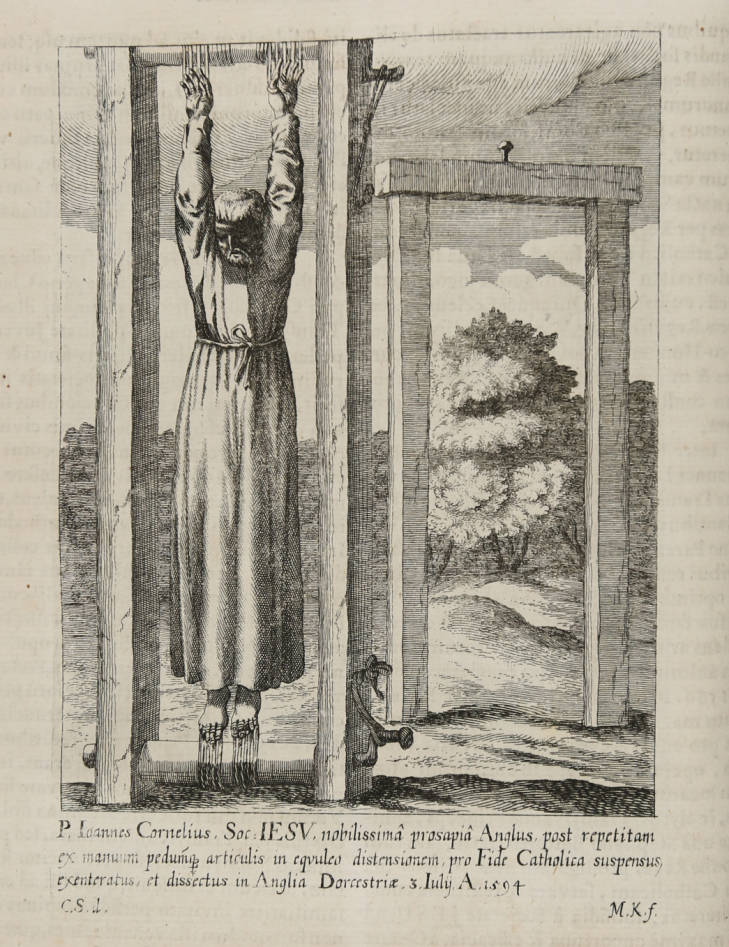
- The Jesuit John Cornelius is tortured on the rack

Martyr
- Born: c. 1557; Bodmin, Cornwall
- Died: 4 July 1594 (aged 36 - 37); Dorchester, England
- Beatified: 15 December 1929 by Pope Pius XI
- Feast: 4 July

John Cornelius (Irish: Seán Conchobhar Ó Mathghamhna; 1557 – 4 July 1594) also called Mohun, was an Irish Catholic priest and Jesuit born in Cornwall. He is a Catholic martyr, beatified in 1929.

== Life ==
John Cornelius was born John Conor O’Mahony, in 1557 of parents from Gaelic Ireland, at Bodmin, in Cornwall, on the estate of Sir John Arundell of Lanherne. O'Mahony later Latinized his middle name, taking the name John Cornelius. Sir John Arundell took an interest in the boy and arranged for him to come up to Exeter College, Oxford. Cornelius went on to the seminary at Reims, and a little later, on 1 April 1580, entered the English College, Rome, to pursue theological studies. After ordination in 1583, he was sent as a missionary to England and served for nearly ten years, making Arundell's house his base of operations. He was the family's priest and he formed a close relationship particularly with Dorothy Arundell whom he encouraged to become a nun.

While acting as chaplain to Sir John's widow Anne, Lady Arundell, he was arrested on 24 April 1594, at Chideock Castle, by the sheriff of Dorsetshire, having been betrayed by one William Holmes, a servant whom he had reprimanded for bothering one of the maids. Cornelius was met on the way by Thomas Bosgrave, a relative of the Arundell family, who offered him his own hat, as he had been dragged out bareheaded. Thereupon, Bosgrave was also arrested. Two servants of the castle, John (or Terence) Carey and Patrick Salmon, Hiberno-Norman natives of Dublin, shared the same fate. When they reached the sheriff's house a number of Anglican clergymen heaped abuse upon the Catholic religion, but the sheriff stopped the disputation.

The missionary was sent to London and brought before the Lord Treasurer, the Archbishop of Canterbury, and others, who, by threats and torture, tried to obtain the names of those who had given him shelter or assistance. He was brought back to Dorchester. Cornelius was accused of high treason, because he was a priest and had returned to England, contrary to the Jesuits, etc. Act 1584; the others were charged with felony, for having rendered assistance to one whom they knew to be a priest; but all were assured that their lives would be spared if they embraced Protestantism. While in prison, John Cornelius was admitted to membership in the Society of Jesus.

Their trial took place in the main hall of what is now Chideock House Hotel and they were condemned to death on 2 July 1594 and executed in Dorchester two days later. The first to ascend the scaffold was John Carey; he kissed the rope, exclaiming "O precious collar", made a solemn profession of faith and died a valiant death. Before his execution Patrick Salmon exhorted the spectators to embrace the Catholic faith, for which he and his companions were giving their lives. Then followed Thomas Bosgrave, who delivered a stirring address on the truth of his belief. The last to suffer was John Cornelius, who kissed the gallows and then quoted St. Andrew, "O good Cross, long desired", etc. On the ladder, he tried to speak to the multitude, but was prevented. After praying for his executioners and for the welfare of the queen, John Cornelius also was executed. His body was taken down and quartered, his head was nailed to the gibbet but soon removed. All the bodies were retrieved and given a proper burial by Lady Arundell. Dorothy Arundell did become a nun and she wrote "Life of Father Cornelius the Martyr" which was kept in the Vatican, but is now lost.

The executed men became known as the Chideock Martyrs. A fifth man, Hugh Green, who became Chideock's chaplain in 1612, was tried and executed in 1642. All five were beatified on 15 December 1929.

== See also ==
- Catholic Church in the United Kingdom
- Douai Martyrs
