= Joanne Berkeley =

English abbess

- Born: 1555 or 1556; Beverston Castle
- Died: 2 August 1616 (aged 60–62)
- Occupation: Nun
- Known for: Abbess of a Convent in Brussels

Joanne Berkeley (1555 or 1556 – 2 August 1616) was an English abbess of the Convent of the Assumption of Our Blessed Lady, Brussels which was established by and for English Catholic women.

== Life ==
Berkeley was born in Beverston Castle in Gloucestershire. Her parents were Frances (born Poyntz) and Sir John Berkeley.

On 14 September 1580 Berkeley received the Benedictine habit at the French monastery of Saint-Pierre-les-Dames, Reims, in a clothing ceremony that was recorded in some detail. Berkeley spent seventeen years as a nun at Rheims.

In 1598 Mary Percy, desiring to live as a nun in an English community, decided to found an English Benedictine monastery in Brussels. This was the first community of English nuns to be established since the Reformation, but it was followed by over a dozen others within the subsequent few decades. Percy asked Berkeley to join the monastery and lead it.

On 14 November 1599 Mathias Hovius, the third Archbishop of Mechelen, installed Berkeley as the first abbess of the English Benedictine monastery in Brussels. The new convent had been approved by the pope and the local authorities and it was funded by novice nuns, Mary Percy, Dorothy and Gertrude Arundell. Percy who was one of the first nuns.

In 1608 Mary Lovel entered the English Benedictine convent in Brussels, attracting criticism for giving her two children into the care of others in order to do so. Lovel left the community again the following year, as Berkeley sought to limit nuns' access to outside confessors. The abbess first sought to establish a separate house for those nuns who insisted on having Jesuit confessors, but was unable to get the necessary permission. She then decided to ban Jesuit confessors from visiting, which caused Lovel, Elizabeth Knatchbull and Elizabeth Digby to leave the house in protest. After another sister interceded, Knatchbull and Digby returned to the community in 1609, but Lovel did not.

Berkeley died in 1616 and she was succeeded by Mary Percy.
