= Edward Worsley =

English Jesuit writer and professor

Edward Worsley (1605 – 2 September 1676) was an English Jesuit writer and professor.

== Life ==
Worsley was born in Lancashire, England, 1605. His cousin was the prioress Anne Worsley. He is said to have been educated at Oxford, but his name does not occur in the University Registers, and it is equally uncertain that he took Anglican orders. Having become a Jesuit on 7 September 1626, he studied at Liège, where he subsequently became a professor of philosophy, logic, and Scripture, winning a great reputation for talent and erudition. He was made a professed father 20 September 1641. Having laboured for a time in London, he became rector of the college at Liège from 1658 till 1662, where he was made procurator at the professed house at Antwerp.

He died at Antwerp, 2 September 1676.

== Works ==
His chief works, mostly written against Edward Stillingfleet, are:

- "Truth will out" (1665);
- "Protestancy without Principles" (1668);
- "Reason and Religion" (1672);
- "The Infallibility of the Roman Catholic Church" (1674);
- "A Discourse of Miracles" (1676);
- "Anti-Goliath" (1678), published after his death.
