= Anne Worsley =

English catholic nun

- Born: 1588
- Died: 1644 (aged 55–56)
- Other name: Anne of the Ascension
- Occupation: Prioress

Anne Worsley, religious name Anne of the Ascension (1588 – 1644) was an English catholic nun. She was the founding prioress of the English Carmelite convent in Antwerp.

== Life ==
Worsley's parents were John and Eleanor (born Hervey) Worsley. Her father had lived on the Isle of Wight. They were persecuted because they were Roman Catholics and they went into exile in the low countries.

Anne decided on a religious life at the age of fifteen when she was living abroad. She decided to be a nun and opted for the Carmelites. This was not unusual; her cousin Edward Worsley was a Jesuit and three of her siblings Thomas, William and Elizabeth became a Jesuit, a priest and a nun respectively. She initially chosen to become a poor Clare but her mother said the life was too austere so the Carmelites gained a novice.

She was the founding prioress of the English Carmelite convent in Antwerp, where her first novice was younger sister Theresa. She had visited Antwerp with her mentor Anne of Saint Bartholomew. Other sources attribute the leadership of the Antwerp convent to her until she died in 1626. She had been separated from her mentor Anne of St Bartholomew, and so when Mary Lovel created a new English Carmel in Antwerp she transferred. The new organisation was established in May 1619 and her initial unhappiness was compounded when she was elected prioress just five weeks after her arrival. The exiled recusant Mary Lovel was not always pleased with the way Anne organised the new convent and she found the management difficult. Lovel would speak outside of the convent against its management.

In 1622 Lovel returned to England to raise more funds. When she returned, she was livid that two Flemish nuns had joined the community. Lovel threatened to cease her funding so the Flemish nuns had to be ejected. Lovel effectively left the convent in 1625.

Worsley died in 1644.
