= Isabella Berinzaga =

Italian mystic and spiritual author

- Born: c. 1551
- Died: c. 1624
- Other names: Isabella Lomazzi
- Occupations: mystic and spiritual author

Isabella Cristina Berinzaga (ca.1551–1624) was an Italian mystic and spiritual author in the Ignatian tradition.

== Life ==
Isabella was born in Milan, probably in 1551, into the Lomazzi family, but preferred to use the name of the uncle who raised her, Berinzaga. She had an unhappy childhood, suffering from poor health and persecution by her aunt.

In 1579 she was accepted as a "spiritual daughter" of the Society of Jesus after an examination by Fr Morales, sent from Rome by Jesuit General Everard Mercurian for the purpose. In 1584 Achille Gagliardi was appointed her spiritual director. In this capacity, he asked her to provide sketches of her spiritual autobiography. These circulated in manuscript for some time and eventually formed the basis for the Breve compendio intorno alla perfezione cristiana (Brescia, 1611).

In the 1590s, the relationship between Berinzaga and her confessor came under negative scrutiny, in large part due to Isabella's claim to have received divine intimations concerning the reform of the Society of Jesus as becoming too invested in education at the expense of direct evangelization. Claudio Acquaviva, attempting to reduce Gagliardi's influence, excluded him from the General Congregation of the Society held in Rome in the winter of 1593–1594, and ordered him to leave Milan. Gagliardi, however, received political support from Juan Fernández de Velasco, Spanish governor of Milan, and was able to have the order temporarily revoked. Ultimately, however, he was forced to leave Milan.

Robert Bellarmine carried out a study of writings circulating in manuscript that were attributed to Berinzaga, and condemned them as "new and dangerous", based on "imagination or illusions". Gagliardi and Berinzaga were censured, and avoided being referred to the Roman Inquisition by accepting the censure. Gagliardi attributed all the offending views to Berinzaga.

She died in Milan in 1624.
