= Scherpenheuvel-Zichem =

- City and municipality
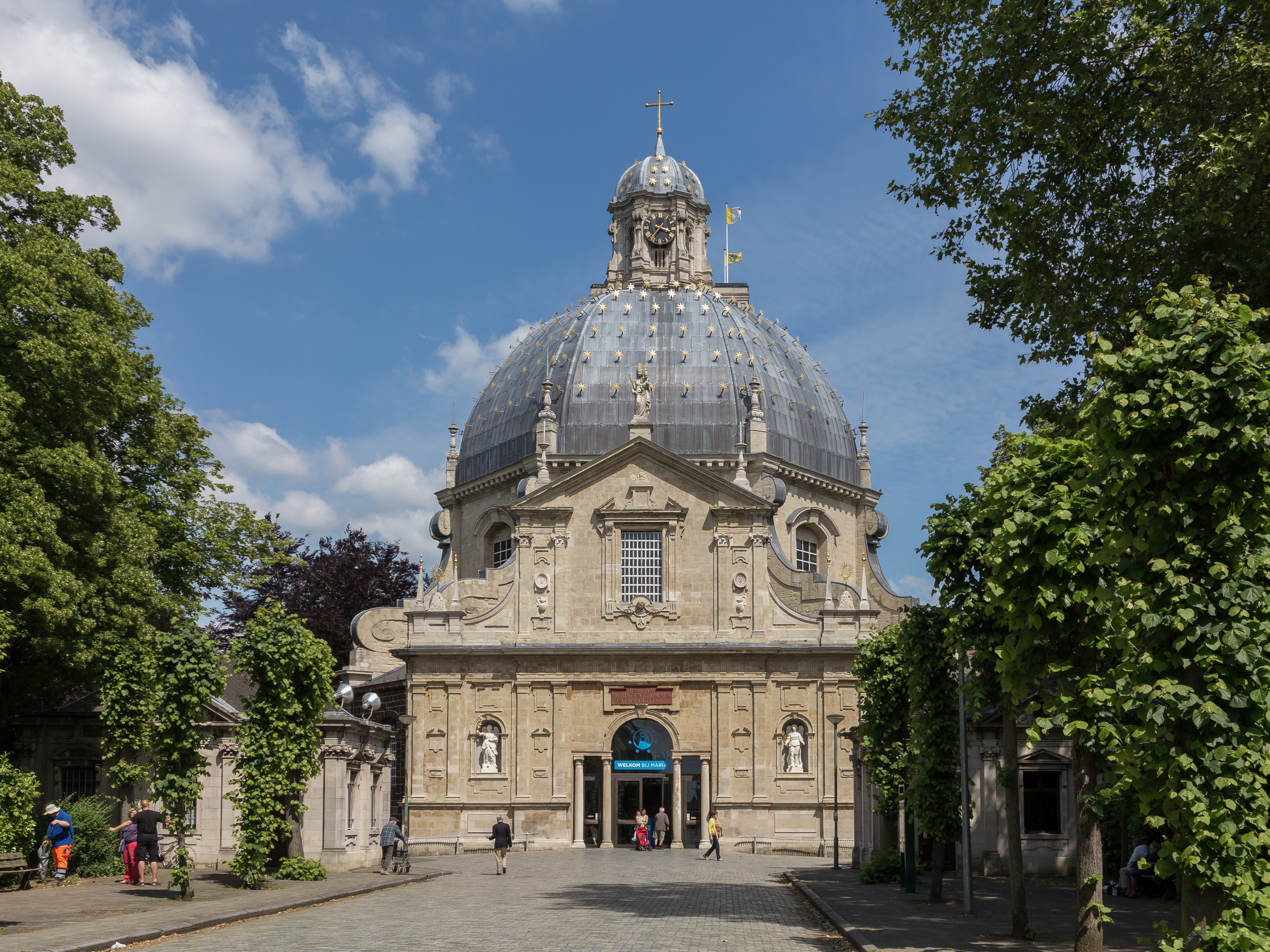
- Basilica of Our Lady of Scherpenheuvel

- Flag Coat of arms

- Location of Scherpenheuvel-Zichem in Flemish Brabant
- Interactive map of Scherpenheuvel-Zichem
- Location in Belgium
- Coordinates: 51°00′N 04°58′E
- Country: Belgium
- Community: Flemish Community
- Region: Flemish Region
- Province: Flemish Brabant
- Arrondissement: Leuven

Government
  - Mayor: Manu Claes (CD&V)
  - Governing party: CD&V-Open VLD

Area
  - Total: 51.15 km^{2} (19.75 sq mi)

Population (2018-01-01)
  - Total: 22,952
  - Density: 448.7/km^{2} (1,162/sq mi)
- Postal codes: 3270-3272
- NIS code: 24134
- Area codes: 013, 016
- Website: www.scherpenheuvel-zichem.be

Scherpenheuvel-Zichem (Dutch pronunciation: [ˌsxɛrpə(n)ɦøːvəl ˈzɪxɛm]; French: Montaigu-Zichem) is a municipality and city located in the province of Flemish Brabant, Flemish Region, Belgium, encompassing the towns of Averbode, Messelbroek, Okselaar, Scherpenheuvel, Schoonderbuken, Keiberg, Kaggevinne, Testelt and Zichem (previously spelled Sichem, like the biblical town). On January 1, 2020, Scherpenheuvel-Zichem had a total population of 23,135. The total area is 50.50km^{2} which gives a population density of 458.1 inhabitants per km^{2}.

== Holy site ==
Scherpenheuvel (English: "Sharp Hill"), the most important pilgrimage (Roman Catholic) site in Belgium, is located some 50km east of Brussels. Its origins date back to the pagan worship that still survived during the Middle-Ages around a holy oak on this hilltop. The cross-shaped tree was thus "Christianized" with a statue of the Holy Mary.

Legend has it that around AD 1500 the Virgin Mary performed a miracle here, freezing into place a shepherd boy who tried to take home the small statue, thus foiling the theft. As of the 1550s, a flood of devoted pilgrims, arriving from surrounding areas, came to the tree to pray for the health and recovery of their ill loved ones. In 1580, the statue disappeared as Dutch-Protestant iconoclasts pillaged the region. Seven years later it was replaced by a new one, which still stands on the altar of the present-day pilgrimage-church. The oak tree being almost dead but still inspiring in fetishist worship alongside the Roman Catholic devotion to Mary was felled by order of the Bishop of Antwerp. A first wooden chapel was built on the site and a number of statues of the Holy Virgin cut out of the trunk found their way to various sanctuaries (such as Luxembourg). The fame of Scherpenheuvel increased and increasing numbers of people arrived, begging for protection against plague and famine that swept the Low Countries as a consequence of the "Eighty Years War" (Dutch Revolt). The chapel soon became far too small for them.

In January 1603 another miracle was reported: the statue wept tears of blood. The religious schism in the Netherlands was blamed for the pain Mary felt. In November 1603 the Spanish army defeated Protestant troops besieging 's-Hertogenbosch, an important fortification in Northern Brabant.

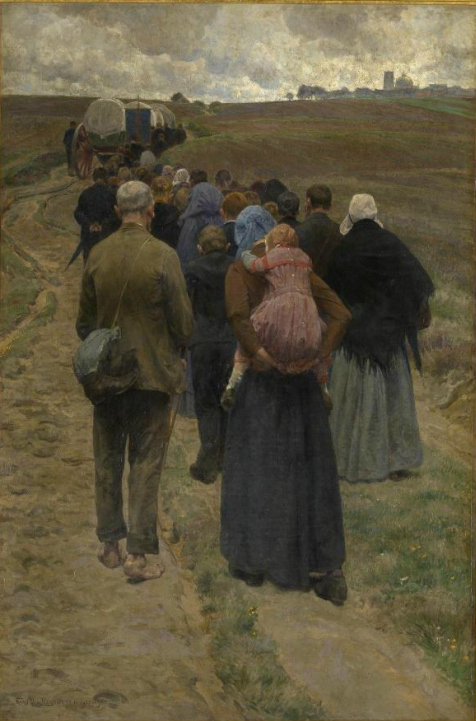
Pilgrims travelling to the Scherpenheuvel, depicted in a triptych by Frans Van Leemputten (1903–05)

Archduke Albert of Austria (appointed by the King of Spain as the governor of the Low Countries), and his wife, the Archduchess Isabella (daughter of King Philip II of Spain) donated funds for the construction of a stone chapel in Scherpenheuvel and made a pilgrimage themselves.

In 1604, a few months after its inauguration by the Bishop of Mechelen, the new chapel was looted by Northern troops. The statue was secured by Jesuits. Two months later the Protestants were chased out of Ostend, their last stronghold in the Southern Netherlands. Again, this victory was attributed to the Holy Virgin. Scherpenheuvel was privileged as a city.

Also in 1604, Philips Numann, clerk of the archbishop of Mechelen, described the legend of Scherpenheuvel in his Historie der Mirakelen (History of Miracles). The legend was classified as a "folk-tale", but he also reported the miracles that were recognised as such by the Catholic authorities. His book was translated from Dutch into French, Spanish and English and spread the fame of Scherpenheuvel all over Western Europe.

In 1607, the famous architect-engineer Wenceslas Cobergher was commissioned to build a bastion of Catholic Counter-reformation: the whole city was to be an allegorical homage to the Mother of God, a hortus conclusus symbolizing her eternal virginity. Seven lanes lead towards the church. Its layout is based on a 7-pointed star, which stands for the abundance of God's mercy. In the church, the advent of Jesus is announced by six Old Testament prophets and realised by Mary who gives birth to the Messiah. In 1609 the first stone was put in place for the unique structure in highly developed baroque style, which was finally inaugurated in 1627. The streets and layout of the town itself were designed to mirror the shape. With its surroundings, it is now one of the best examples of the triumphalist architecture of Counter-Reformation in Belgium. The dome, adorned with 298 golden stars, symbolizes the cosmos. The main altar is said to be placed on the exact spot where the old oak tree once stood. Archduchess Isabella attended the inauguration-mass without her deceased husband. She came on foot from nearby Diest, which gave rise to the foot-pilgrimages that still survive from places as distant as Maastricht and Bergen op Zoom. She put all her gold and jewellery before the altar, a custom that persists to this day, in the form of coin throwing.

The pilgrimage at Scherpenheuvel flourished. The Oratorianen, an order of religious fathers occupied with religious worship and pilgrimage logistics, had their abbey connected to the church by the "baroque gallery". They were chased away during the French occupation after the 1797 revolution and did not return until after the religious restoration at the beginning of the 19th century.

In 1927, the church was proclaimed a Roman Catholic "basilica minor".

Other traditions that survive the centuries at Scherpenheuvel are the Kaarskensprocessie (Procession of the candles) on 2 November and blessing-processions for people, pets and animals, and vehicles. The popularity of the pilgrimage also has a lot to do with the year-round fairground atmosphere that characterizes the place: Many stalls selling souvenirs, sweets, typical baked goods such as "pepernoten" and "noppen", hotels, bars and restaurants of different kinds.
