= Robert Chambers (priest) =

English Catholic priest, writer and translator

- Born: 1571; Yorkshire
- Died: 1628 (aged 56–57); Habsburg Netherlands
- Education: English College, Rheims; English College, Rome
- Years active: 1594–1623
- Church: Catholic
- Ordained: 1594
- Writings: Palestina (1600)
- Offices held: Confessor to the English Benedictine nuns in Brussels

Robert Chambers (1571–1628), was a Catholic priest from Yorkshire.

== Life ==
As a boy Chambers was sent to the English College in Rheims to be educated as a Catholic. In 1593 he was admitted to the English College, Rome, where he was ordained priest in 1594. From 1599 to 1623 he was confessor to the English Benedictine nuns in Brussels. He died in Flanders in 1628. He was also a writer and translator.

== Works ==
- Palestina (Florence, 1600), an allegorical romance
- Philip Numan, Miracles lately wrought by the intercession of the Glorious Virgin Mary at Mont-aigu, nere unto Sichen in Brabant, translated out of the French (Antwerp, 1606)
