= Mary Percy (abbess) =

English noblewoman and abbess (1570–1642)

Lady Mary Percy O.S.B.
- Abbess of the English Benedictine Monastery in Brussels
- Elected: 1616
- In office: 1616–1642
- Predecessor: Joanne Berkeley
- Successor: Agnes Lenthall

Personal details
- Born: 11 June 1570
- Died: 13 September 1642 (aged 72) Brussels, Duchy of Brabant, Habsburg Netherlands
- Parents: Thomas Percy, 7th Earl of Northumberland, Anne Percy, Countess of Northumberland

Mary Percy (1570–1642) was an English noblewoman who founded an English Benedictine Monastery in Brussels and served as its abbess.

== Life ==
Mary Percy was born on 11 June 1570, the youngest daughter of Thomas Percy, 7th Earl of Northumberland, and his wife Anne Somerset. Her father was executed for his part in the Rising of the North and her mother who had been involved, left the country with the infant Mary. Her siblings were left in England and brought up by their paternal uncle, Henry Percy, 8th Earl of Northumberland.

Feeling called to religious life, she first spent some time with the Flemish Augustinian Canonesses. Finding this unsatisfactory, she decided to establish a Benedictine convent for English women. She purchased a house in Brussels and asked Benedictine nun Joanne Berkeley to be abbess. Percy was joined by Dorothy Arundell, and Dorothy's sister, Gertrude. This was the first community of English nuns to be established since the Reformation.

The Convent of the Assumption of Our Blessed Lady was established in Brussels on 21 November 1599. Percy was clothed as a nun and made her profession of vows on 21 November 1600. The first abbess was Joanne Berkeley. Percy brought to the monastery a dowry of 5000 florins. Difficulties arose between those nuns who wanted a Jesuit confessor and those who preferred a different spiritual approach. These disagreements persisted into Percy's subsequent tenure as abbess.

Berkeley died in 1616 and Percy was elected abbess, serving until her death in Brussels on 13 September 1642. The convent had the support of the Infanta Isabella.

== Works ==
- Innocency Justified and Insolency Repressed (1632), Harley MS 4275
- Isabella Berinzaga, Abridgement of Christian Perfection, translated by Mary Percy.
