= Mary Lovel =

English aristocrat and nun (1562–1628)

Mary Lovel(l)
- Born: Jane Roper; 1564
- Died: 12 November 1628 (aged 63–64); Bruges
- Other name: Mary Roper
- Occupations: aristocrat and nun
- Known for: founder of a convent in Antwerp
- Spouse: Sir Robert Lovel
- Children: two

Mary Lovel (1564–1628), born Jane Roper and also known as Mary Roper and Lady Lovel, was the founder of the English Carmelite convent in Antwerp.

== Life ==
Lovel died in Bruges. Her parents were Elizabeth (born Parke) and John Roper, Baron Teynham who lived at the Lodge in Lynsted in Kent which was built in 1599. Her father was the chief clerk of the common pleas. She appears to have been called Jane but she was later called Mary.

In 1597 she gave birth to Christina Lovel. The child's father was a soldier named Sir Robert Lovel of Merton Abbey in Kent (who she had married at some date before). The marriage was not a long one and Robert's death is thought to have been before 1606. The marriage resulted in Christina and her younger sister Elizabeth and left Mary Lovel a widow. In 1606 she was questioned concerning her involvement in the Gunpowder Plot. It was admitted that she had known the major conspirator Sir Robert Catesby for some time and he had visited her house in the company of Sir Everard Digby. Her house in Highgate was a meeting place for Catholics.

In 1608 she was criticised for considering becoming a nun at the English Benedictine monastery in Brussels, as it would have meant abandoning her children. She left the convent anyway in 1609 as the abbess, Joanne Berkeley, did not agree with her view about confessors being Jesuits. Berkeley had wanted to found a new convent to house difficult nuns such as Lovel, but she could not get permission. Berkeley had decided to ban Jesuit special assistants at confession and this caused Lovel, Elizabeth Knatchbull and Elizabeth/Magdalen Digby to leave. Another sister interceded with the abbess and Knatchbull and Digby returned in 1609 - but not Lovel.

When Lovel created a new English Carmel in Antwerp, Anne Worsley, who had been a prioress previously, transferred to the new house. Lovel's initial investment was £2,200 with £600 of that being for church ornaments. The new convent was established in May 1619 and Worseley was elected prioress just five weeks after her arrival. Lovel was not always pleased with how the prioress organised the new convent. Lovel would speak outside of the convent against its management. In 1622 Lovel returned to England to raise more funds and when she returned she was annoyed that two Flemish nuns had joined the community. Lovel threatened to cease funding the convent so the Flemish nuns had to be ejected. Lovel lost interest in that convent in 1625 and decided to create another at Bruges.

She died in Bruges on 12 November 1628, having not yet established her new convent. She was buried by the high altar of the Church of Our Lady in Bruges.
