= John Carey (martyr) =

Irish Roman Catholic martyr

Blesseds Thomas Bosgrave, John Carey, and Patrick Salmon
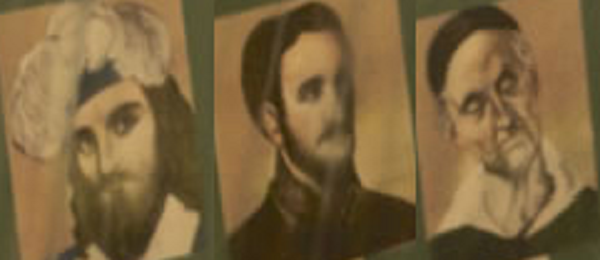
- Portraits in the Chideock Martyrs Church in Chideock, England

Laymen
- Died: 4 July 1594; Dorchester, England
- Beatified: 15 December 1929 by Pope Pius XI
- Feast: 4 July

John Carey (died 4 July 1594) was martyred at Dorchester, Dorset, England, for adherence to the Roman Catholic faith. His feast day is 4 July.

John (or Terence) Carey was an Irish layman, born in Dublin, and servant of Thomas Bosgrave and was put to death with Thomas Bosgrave, John Cornelius (a priest, born of Irish parents in Bodmin in Cornwall), and Patrick Salmon, another lay helper also of Dublin birth, at Dorchester in Dorset in 1594. They were all beatified in 1929.

The persecution was part of a crackdown by the Elizabethan government after the passing of the Jesuits, etc. Act 1584, which made it an offence punishable by death to seek ordination to the priesthood overseas and return to England. Those apprehended suffered a "traitor's death": partial choking by hanging, then evisceration whilst still alive, and quartering. The authorities hoped that by staging such spectacles the arrival of young, idealistic missionary priests (most of whom were English), inspired by the Counter-Reformation, would be brought to an end.

John Cornelius was chaplain to the Arundell family, which service took him to Chideock Castle, where he was arrested. The two lay helpers, John Carey and Patrick Salmon, were servants at the castle. Thomas Bosgrave was a relative of the Arundells.

John Cornelius was accused of high treason, by virtue of being a Catholic priest and returning to England. The others were charged with a felony, for having rendered assistance to one whom they knew to be a priest. Their trial took place in the main hall of what is now Chideock House Hotel; they were condemned to death on 2 July 1594 and executed two days later. The two lay helpers refused the offer of amnesty through the abjuration of their allegiance to Catholicism and conversion to the Protestant faith. All were hanged, drawn, and quartered, at Dorchester, Oxfordshire, England. When he mounted the scaffold, Carey is reported as saying aloud "Oh, precious collar!". The Arundell family retrieved the bodies for proper burial. The men became known as the Chideock Martyrs.

== See also ==
- List of Catholic martyrs of the English Reformation
