= Douai Martyrs =

English and Welsh Roman Catholic priests and martyrs

Saints, Blesseds, and Venerables The Douai Martyrs

Priests and Martyrs
- Born: Various
- Died: 29 November 1577 (Saint Cuthbert Mayne) - 23 October 1680 (Blessed Thomas Thwing); Various, many at Tyburn
- Venerated in: Roman Catholic Church (6 were declared Venerable by Pope Leo XIII in 1886)
- Beatified: 14 beatified on 29 December 1886 by Pope Leo XIII 62 beatified on 15 December 1929 by Pope Pius XI 56 beatified on 22 November 1987 by Pope John Paul II
- Canonized: 20 canonized on 25 October 1970 by Pope Paul VI
- Feast: 29 October; 4 May (all English Martyrs); 25 October (those from the Forty Martyrs of England and Wales group); 22 November (those from the Eighty-five martyrs of England and Wales group); Various feast days for individual martyrs
- Attributes: Martyr's palm Knife in chest Noose around neck Book or Bible; Crucifix; Chaucible; Eucharist; Various religious habits Crown of martyrdom

The Douai Martyrs is a name applied by the Catholic Church to 158 Catholic priests from Great Britain who studied at the English College, Douai and were subsequently executed by the Kingdom of England between 1577 and 1680.

== History ==
Having completed their training at Douai, many Catholic priests returned to England and Wales with the intent to minister to the Catholic population there. Under the Jesuits, etc. Act 1584 the presence of a Catholic priest within the realm was considered high treason. Missionaries from Douai were looked upon as papal agents intent on overthrowing the state. Many were arrested under charges of treason and conspiracy, resulting in torture and execution. In total, 158 members of Douai College were martyred between the years 1577 and 1680. The first was Cuthbert Mayne, executed at Launceston, Cornwall on the 29 November 1577. The last was Thomas Thwing, hanged, drawn, and quartered at York in October 1680. Each time the news of another execution reached the College, a Solemn Mass of thanksgiving was sung.

Many people risked their lives during this period by assisting them, which was also prohibited under the Act. A number of the "seminary priests" from Douai were executed at a three-sided gallows at Tyburn near the present-day Marble Arch. A plaque to the "Catholic martyrs" executed at Tyburn in the period 1535 - 1681 is located at 8 Hyde Park Place, the site of Tyburn convent.

They were beatified between 1886, 1929 and 1987, and only 20 were canonized in 1970. Today, British Catholic dioceses celebrate their feast day on 29 October.

- Bl Alexander Crow
- Bl Anthony Middleton
- Bl Anthony Page
- Bl Christopher Bales
- Bl Christopher Buxton
- Bl Christopher Robinson
- Bl Christopher Wharton
- Bl Edmund Catherick
- Bl Edmund Duke
- Bl Edmund Sykes
- Bl Edward Bamber
- Bl Edward Burden
- Bl Edward James
- Bl Edward Jones
- Bl Edward Osbaldeston
- Bl Edward Stransham
- Bl Edward Thwing
- Bl Edward Waterson
- Bl Everald Hanse
- Bl Francis Ingleby
- Bl Francis Page
- Bl George Beesley
- Bl George Gervase
- Bl George Haydock
- Bl George Napper
- Bl George Nichols
- Bl Henry Heath
- Bl Hugh Green
- Bl Hugh More
- Bl Hugh Taylor
- Bl James Claxton
- Bl James Fenn
- Bl James Thompson
- Bl John Adams
- Bl John Amias
- Bl John Bodey
- Bl John Cornelius
- Bl John Duckett
- Bl John Hambley
- Bl John Hogg
- Bl John Ingram
- Bl John Lockwood
- Bl John Lowe
- Bl John Munden
- Bl John Nelson
- Bl John Nutter
- Bl John Pibush
- Bl John Robinson
- Bl John Sandys
- Bl John Shert
- Bl John Slade
- Bl John Sugar
- Bl John Thules
- Bl Joseph Lambton
- Bl Lawrence Richardson
- Bl Mark Barkworth
- Bl Matthew Flathers
- Bl Montfort Scott
- Bl Nicholas Garlick
- Bl Nicholas Postgate
- Bl Nicholas Woodfen
- Bl Peter Snow
- Bl Ralph Crockett
- Bl Richard Hill
- Bl Richard Holiday
- Bl Richard Kirkman
- Bl Richard Newport
- Bl Richard Sergeant
- Bl Richard Simpson
- Bl Richard Thirkeld
- Bl Richard Yaxley
- Bl Robert Anderton
- Bl Robert Dalby
- Bl Robert Dibdale
- Bl Robert Drury
- Bl Robert Johnson
- Bl Robert Ludlam
- Bl Robert Nutter
- Bl Robert Sutton
- Bl Robert Thorpe
- Bl Robert Wilcox
- Bl Roger Cadwallador
- Bl Roger Filcock
- Bl Stephen Rowsham
- Bl Thomas Alfield
- Bl Thomas Atkinson
- Bl Thomas Belson
- Bl Thomas Cottam
- Bl Thomas Maxfield
- Bl Thomas Palaser
- Bl Thomas Pilchard
- Bl Thomas Pormort
- Bl Thomas Reynolds
- Bl Thomas Sherwood
- Bl Thomas Somers
- Bl Thomas Sprott
- Bl Thomas Thwing
- Bl Thomas Tunstal
- Bl Thurstan Hunt
- Bl William Andleby
- Bl William Davies
- Bl William Filby
- Bl William Harrington
- Bl William Hart
- Bl William Hartley
- Bl William Lacey
- Bl William Marsden
- Bl William Patenson
- Bl William Southerne
- Bl William Spenser
- Bl William Thomson
- Bl William Ward
- Bl William Way
- St Alban Bartholomew Roe
- St Alexander Briant
- St Ambrose Edward Barlow
- St Cuthbert Mayne
- St Edmund Arrowsmith
- St Edmund Campion
- St Edmund Gennings
- St Eustace White
- St Henry Morse
- St Henry Walpole
- St John Almond
- St John Boste
- St John Kemble
- St John Payne
- St John Southworth
- St John Wall
- St Luke Kirby
- St Ralph Sherwin
- St Robert Southwell
- Ven Edward Morgan
- Ven Thomas Tichborne
- Bl Alexander Rawlins
- Bl Edward Campion
- Francis Dickinson
- James Bird
- James Harrison
- John Finglow
- John Goodman
- John Hewitt
- Matthias Harrison
- Miles Gerard
- St Polydore Plasden
- Richard Horner
- Robert Leigh
- Robert Morton
- Robert Watkinson
- Roger Dickinson
- Bl Thomas Felton
- Bl Thomas Ford
- Thomas Hemerford
- Thomas Holford
- William Dean
- William Freeman
- Bl William Gunter
- Bl William Richardson

The Douay Martyrs School in Ickenham, Middlesex is named in their honour.

== See also ==
- Douai Bible
- Douai, France
- List of Catholic martyrs of the English Reformation
