= Edward James (martyr) =

English Catholic priest and martyr (c.1557–1588)

Blessed Edward James
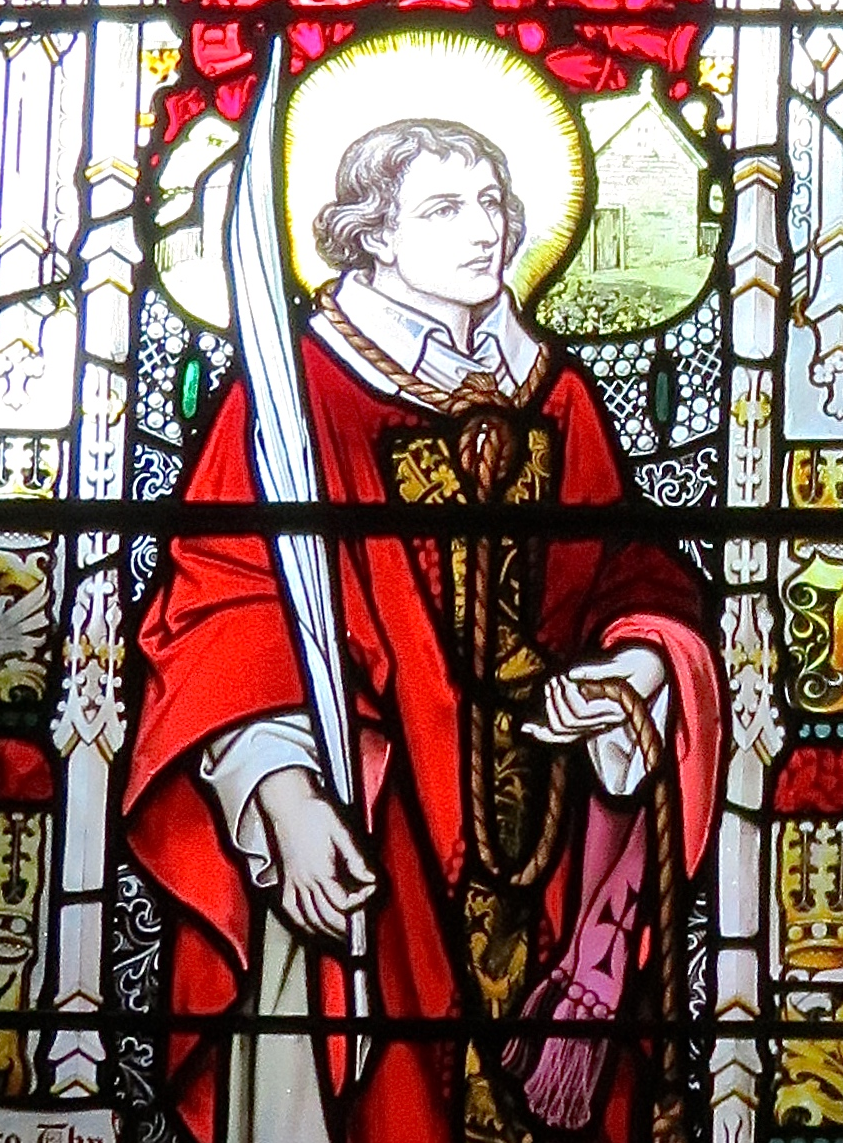
- Stained glass window in St. Mary's Roman Catholic Church in Bridge Gate, Derby.

Martyr
- Born: c. 1557; Barton, Breaston, near Long Eaton, Derbyshire, England
- Died: 1 October 1588 (aged 30 - 31); Chichester, West Sussex, England
- Honored in: Roman Catholic Church
- Beatified: 15 December 1929 by Pope Pius XI
- Feast: 1 October

Edward James (c.1557 – 1 October 1588) was an English Catholic priest and martyr.

== Education ==
James was born at Barton, Breaston, near Long Eaton, Derbyshire. He was educated at Derby School, St John's College, Oxford, the English college at Rheims and the Venerable English College at Rome. In early October 1579, he and William Filby sailed from Dover for Calais. Arriving in Rheims, he took up rooms with Edward Stransham. The following August, James and ten others travelled to the English College, Rome. In October 1583, James was ordained as a priest in Rome by Bishop Thomas Goldwell, the last survivor of the English bishops who had refused to accept the Protestant Reformation.

== Martyrdom ==
In early February 1586, James left Rheims for the mission, accompanied by Stephen Rowsham who had been banished from England the year before. They met up with Ralph Crockett in Dieppe. He was captured on board a ship at Littlehampton, Sussex, on 19 April 1586, with three other priests, Thomas Bramston, George Potter, and his fellow martyr, Ralph Crockett, and they were charged with being Catholic priests and coming into the realm of England contrary to an Act of Parliament of 1584. All four were sent to London and put in prison there on 27 April 1586, where they remained for more than two years without trial.

After the failure of the Spanish Armada, an attempt to invade England which was defeated in July and August 1588, the government of Queen Elizabeth I wanted revenge, and the priests in its custody became a target. Four of these, Ralph Crockett, Edward James, John Oven and Francis Edwardes, were sent for trial at Chichester on 30 September 1588. All four were condemned to death for being priests and entering England, but Oven then took the Oath of Supremacy, in accordance with the Act of Supremacy 1559, and was reprieved. On 1 October 1588, the other three were drawn on a hurdle to Broyle Heath, near Chichester, where Edwardes recanted and was also reprieved. Crockett and James continued to refuse to recant and to take the oath and were executed at Chichester, after absolving each other.

Both Ralph Crockett and Edward James were later declared venerable by the Catholic Church. In 1929 the two were beatified by Pope Pius XI. His feast day is 1 October.

== See also ==
- Catholic Church in the United Kingdom
- Douai Martyrs
