= Holford (surname) =

Holford is a surname. Notable people with the surname include:

- Castello Holford (1845 - 1905), American author of Aristopia
- David Holford (born 1940), West Indian cricketer
- George Holford (1860–1926), British soldier and courtier
- Karen Holford, Welsh engineer and academic
- Ingrid Holford (1920–2012), English meteorologist and author
- John Holford (1909–1997), Royal Navy medical officer
- Margaret Holford (the elder) (1757–1834), English novelist, playwright, and poet
- Margaret Holford (1778–1852), (also published as Margaret Hodson), English poet and translator
- Michael Holford (born 1983), English rugby player
- Patrick Holford, controversial British nutritionist
- Robert Stayner Holford (1808–1892), British politician
- Thomas Holford (1541–1588), Catholic priest and martyr
- Tom Holford (1878–1964), English footballer
- William Holford, Baron Holford (1907–1975), British town planner
