= Halford =

Halford may refer to:

== Place names ==
- Halford, Shropshire, England
- Halford, Warwickshire, England
- Halford Island, Nunavut, Canada

== Other uses ==
- Halford (surname)
- Halford Mackinder (1861–1947), geographer, a founder of the study of geopolitics
- USS Halford (DD-480), US Navy ship named after William Halford
- Halford (band), heavy metal band featuring Rob Halford
- Halford baronets, baronetcies in the UK
- Halford Special, British racing car

== See also ==
- Halfords - a British retailer
- Holford (disambiguation)
