= William Lacy (Catholic priest) =

English Catholic priest and martyr

Blessed William Lacy

Martyr
- Born: Yorkshire, England
- Died: 22 August 1582; York, England
- Venerated in: Roman Catholic Church
- Beatified: 29 December 1886 by Pope Leo XIII
- Feast: 22 August
- Attributes: Martyr's palm, evangelistary

William Lacy (Lacey) (died 1582) was an English Catholic priest and martyr. He and fellow priest Richard Kirkman were executed at York on 22 August 1582.

== Biography ==
William was born at Houghton (or Tosside, West Riding). He married a widow, named Creswell, whose sons, Arthur and Joseph, became Jesuits. Little is related of his family by his biographers. He had a brother Ralph of Preston, a sister Barbara, and nephews (apparently her sons) Robert and William (Cal. S. P., Dom. add. 1566-79, London, 1871, p. 562). He held a position of emolument under the Crown, possibly as coroner, till about 1565. One of this name, probably a relative, was a coroner for the West Riding in 1581-2 (Dasent, "Acts of the Privy Council", xiii, 358).

He was one of those gentlemen whose house was open to priests that came from the colleges abroad. Having been advised by them that he could not in good conscience attend Protestant churches, his absence was noted and he was forced to give up his position. He was subject to repeated fines, until he had to leave his home and stay with friends, but never long in one place. For fourteen years he suffered persecution for his faith, which included imprisonment at Hull. After the death of his wife, he went abroad and arrived at Reims, 22 June 1580. On 25 September following he went on to Pont-à-Mousson, and thence to Rome, where, after obtaining a dispensation, he became a priest. The dispensation was necessary as Lacy had been married. On 10 May 1581, he was at Loreto on his way to England.

He was arrested after a Mass said by Thomas Bell, afterwards an apostate, in York Castle, 22 July 1582. He suffered great hardships, being loaded with heavy irons, confined in an underground dungeon, and subjected to numerous examinations. He was arraigned on 11 August, probably under the Bulls, etc., from Rome Act 1571 and 13 Eliz. 1. c. 3. He was executed at York, 22 August 1582.

Blessed Richard Kirkman

Priest and Martyr
- Born: Addingham, England
- Died: 22 August 1582; York, England
- Venerated in: Roman Catholic Church
- Beatified: 29 December 1886 by Pope Leo XIII
- Feast: 22 August
- Attributes: Noose in neck, book, martyr's palm

== Richard Kirkman ==
Richard Kirkman was born at Addingham in the West Riding of Yorkshire. He arrived at Douai in 1577 and, after the transference of the English College to Reims, he was ordained subdeacon there, along with Richard Thirkeld, on 14 March 1579. Kirkman was ordained priest on the following Holy Saturday. He said his first Mass in the Abbey Church of the Benedictine nuns of St Peter's.

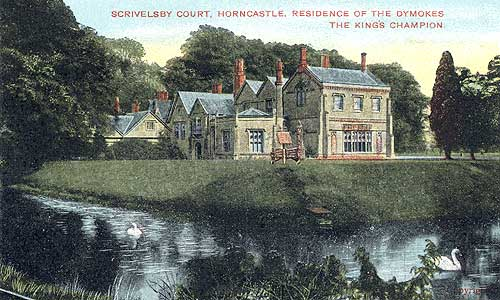
Scrivelsby Court

He left for the English mission on 3 August 1579, with Alexander Briant and three others. On his return to England in August he seems to have found a refuge with Robert Dymoke, hereditary Champion of England (died in Lincoln gaol for his faith, 11 September 1580), at Scrivelsby, Lincolnshire. Kirkman was represented as a schoolmaster for Dymoke's sons. He laboured for four years on the English Mission. When Dymoke was arrested on the charge of recusancy, Kirkman fled north. Being questioned as a stranger in those parts, he was eventually arrested near Wakefield on 8 August 1582 by Francis Wortley of Wortley, JP, and seems to have been arraigned a day or two after under 23 Eliz. 1. c. 1. After condemnation the two priests shared one cell in a turret till 10 August, when Kirkman was removed to an underground dungeon. He was executed on 22 August 1582.

== See also ==
- Douai Martyrs
