= Holford (disambiguation) =

Holford is a village in Somerset, England.

Holford may also refer to:

- Holford (surname)
- Holford, a community within Chatsworth, Ontario
- Holford Bonds, real estate bonds in Arkansas, USA
- Holford, a district of Perry Barr, Birmingham, England
- River Holford in Somerset, England
- Blessed Thomas Holford Catholic College in Cheshire, England

== See also ==
- Halford (disambiguation)
