= John Hambley =

John Hambley is the name of:

- John Hambley (martyr), 16th-century English Catholic and martyr, who died during the reign of Elizabeth I
- John Hambley (producer), 20th-century film producer
