= Tony Middleton =

Tony Middleton may refer to:

- Tony Middleton (cricketer) (born 1964), former English cricketer
- Tony Middleton (singer) (1934–2024), American singer

== See also ==
- Anthony Middleton (died 1590), English Roman Catholic priest and martyr
- Mark-Anthony Middleton, American politician
