= Blessed James =

Blessed James may refer to:

- James Thompson
- James Duckett
- James of Sandomierz
- James Salomoni
- Santiago Mestre Iborra
- Jakob Gapp
- Jakob Franz Alexander Kern
- James Alberione
- Jacques Ghazir Haddad
- Giacomo Cusmano
