= John Lockwood =

John Lockwood may refer to:

- Blessed John Lockwood (priest) (1555–1642), English Roman Catholic priest and martyr
- John Lockwood (British politician) (1890–1983), English Conservative Party politician, Member of Parliament, 1931–1935, 1950–1955
- Sir John Lockwood (classicist) (1903–1965), British classicist and university administrator
- Johnny Lockwood (1920–2013), British/Australian actor
- John Lockwood (Australian politician) (born 1936), member of the Queensland Legislative Assembly

== See also ==
- John Lockwood Kipling (1837−1911), English art teacher, illustrator, and museum curator who spent most of his career in British India, father of the author Rudyard Kipling
