= Patenson =

Patenson is a surname. Notable people with the surname include:

- Henry Patenson (1487–1543), English household jester
- William Patenson (died 1591 or 1592), English Catholic priest
