= Robert Dalby =

English Roman Catholic priest and martyr

Blessed Robert Dalby
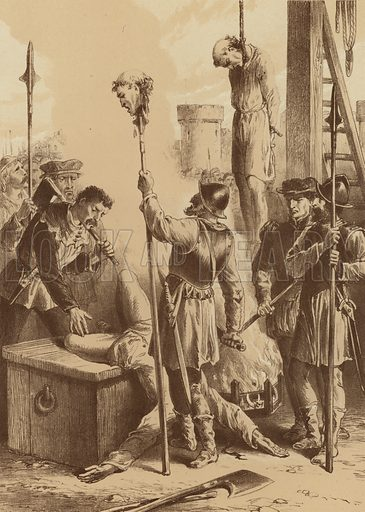
- John Amias and Robert Dalby, "At the place of Execution." Illustration for Memoirs of Missionary Priests by Bishop Challoner (Jack, 1878)
- Born: Hemingbrough, West Riding of Yorkshire
- Died: 16 March 1589; Outside the city of York
- Beatified: 15 December 1929 by Pope Pius XI
- Feast: 16 March

Robert Dalby (died 1589) was an English Catholic priest and martyr.

== Life ==
Robert Dalby (sometimes called Drury), came from Hemingbrough in the West Riding of Yorkshire (now North Yorkshire) lived at first as a Protestant minister. Becoming a Catholic, he entered the English College at Rheims on 30 September 1586 to study for the priesthood. He was ordained a priest at Châlons on 16 April 1588. It was on 25 August that year that he set out for England. He was arrested almost immediately upon landing at Scarborough on the Yorkshire coast and imprisoned in York Castle. Given the 1585 Act making it a capital offence to be a Catholic priest in England the terrible sentence of hanging, drawing and quartering was inevitable. It was carried out outside the city of York on 16 March 1589. His fate was shared by a fellow priest, known to us as John Amias. On arrival at the place of execution the prisoners prostrated themselves in prayer. Robert Dalby had to watch his fellow priest be hanged and quartered before his own turn came, but he displayed no hesitation in going to his death.

Both priests were declared "Blessed" by Pope Pius XI on 15 December 1929.

== See also ==
- Douai Martyrs

== Sources ==
Anstruther, Godfrey Anstruther. Seminary Priests, St Edmund's College, Ware, vol. 1, 1968, p. 96.
