= Hugh Green (martyr) =

English Roman Catholic priest and martyr

Blessed Hugh Green
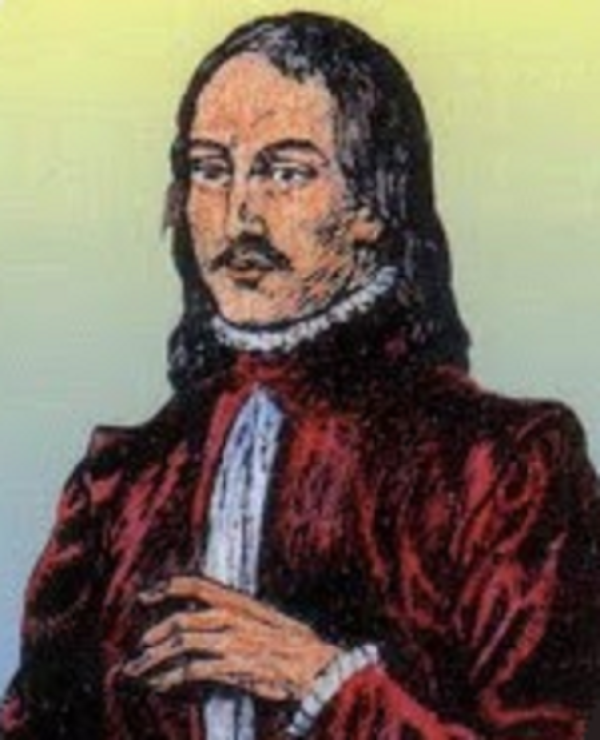

Martyr
- Born: c. 1584; London, England
- Died: 19 August 1642; Dorchester, Dorset, England
- Honored in: Roman Catholic Church
- Beatified: 15 December 1929 by Pope Pius XI
- Feast: 19 August

Hugh Green (c. 1584 – 19 August 1642 in Dorchester) was an English Catholic priest who was beatified by the Catholic Church in 1929. He was also known as Ferdinand Brooks or Ferdinand Brown.

== Life ==
Green was born in London. His parents were members of the Church of England and sent him to Peterhouse, Cambridge, where he took his degree in 1605. Afterward, he converted to the Roman Catholic Church and in 1610 entered Douai College, a center for Catholic studies in the north of France. He was ordained to priesthood on 14 June 1612, and then returned to England to take up the post of a chaplain at Chideock Castle, Dorset.

On 8 March 1642, King Charles I, to placate the Puritan Parliament of England, issued a proclamation banishing all priests. Green resolved to obey this order. Unfortunately the news had been late in reaching him, and when he embarked the month of grace given for departure was just over. He was arrested in Lyme Regis two days after expiration of the deadline whilst he was seeking a vessel to take him to France. He was taken to Dorchester, tried, and condemned to death in August.

John Hungerford Pollen said that in prison his constancy so affected his fellow-captives that two or three women sentenced to die with him sent him word that they would ask his absolution before death. They did so after confessing their sins to the people, and were absolved by the martyr. His executioner was quite unskilled and could not find Green's heart; the butchery, with appalling cruelty, was prolonged for nearly half an hour. After his execution, the mob played football with his head.

The Dorset Martyrs Memorial at Gallows Hill in Dorchester was created by Dame Elisabeth Frink and was erected in 1986.

== See also ==
- Catholic Church in the United Kingdom
- Douai Martyrs
