= John Pibush =

English Catholic priest and martyr

John Pibush (born at Thirsk, Yorkshire, England; died at St Thomas's Waterings, Camberwell, 18 February 1601) was an English Catholic priest. He is a Catholic martyr, beatified in 1929.

== Life ==
According to Joseph Gillow he was probably a son of Thomas Pibush, of Great Fencote, and Jane, sister to Peter Danby of Scotton. He came to Reims on 4 August 1580, received minor orders and subdiaconate in September, and diaconate in December, 1586, and was ordained on 14 March 1587.

He was sent on the English mission on 3 January 1588-9, arrested at Moreton-in-Marsh, Gloucestershire, in 1593, and sent to London, where he arrived before 24 July. The Privy Council committed him to the Gatehouse at Westminster, where he remained a year. He was then tried at the Gloucester Assizes under the Jesuits, etc. Act 1584, for being a priest, but not sentenced, and was returned to Gloucester gaol, whence he escaped on 19 February (1594-5). The next day he was recaptured at Matson and taken back to Gloucester gaol, whence he was sent to the Marshalsea, London, and again tried under the same statute at Westminster on 1 July 1595.

He was sentenced to suffer the penalties of high treason at St. Thomas's Waterings, and in the meantime was to be returned to the Marshalsea. However, by the end of the year he was in the Queen's Bench prison, where he remained for more than five years. The sentence was carried out after one year's notice.

== See also ==
- Catholic Church in the United Kingdom
- Douai Martyrs
