= Halford (surname) =

Halford is a surname. Notable people with the surname include:

- Alison Halford (1940–2025), British senior police officer and politician
- Bruce Halford (1931–2001), British racing driver
- Charles Halford (born 1980), American actor
- Curtis Halford (1943–2025), American politician in Tennessee
- Frank Halford (1894–1955), English aircraft engine designer
- Frederic M. Halford (1884–1914), British angling author
- George Halford (bishop) (1865–1948), Bishop of Rockhampton, England
- George Britton Halford (1824–1910), founder of the first medical school in Australia
- Greg Halford (born 1984), English footballer
- Henry Halford, 1st Baronet (1766–1844), physician to several English monarchs
- Johnny Halford (1930–2013), American racing driver
- Laura Halford (born 1996), British gymnast
- Paul Halford, New Zealand soccer player
- Richard Halford (1662–1742), English politician
- Rob Halford (born 1951), Judas Priest vocalist
- Sharon Halford (born 1953), Falkland Islands politician
- Steve Halford (born 1980), English footballer
- William Halford (1841–1919), US Navy sailor awarded the Medal of Honor

== See also ==
- Halford Boudewyn (1921–1998), Singaporean police officer and spy
