= Thomas Aufield =

English Roman Catholic priest and martyr

Blessed Thomas Aufield
- Born: 1552; Gloucestershire
- Died: 6 July 1585; Newgate, Tyburn
- Venerated in: Roman Catholic Church
- Beatified: 1929
- Feast: 6 July

Thomas Aufield (1552 – 6 July 1585), also called Thomas Alfield, was an English Roman Catholic martyr.

He was born in Gloucestershire and educated at Eton College and King's College, Cambridge. He then converted to Roman Catholicism and in September 1576 went to the English College at Douai, France, but suspecting danger returned to England in November.

In September 1580 Aufield returned to the English College, by then at Rheims. He was ordained a priest on 4 March 1581 at Châlons-sur-Marne and later that month set out for the English Mission. He seems to have mostly operated in the North, where he was arrested on 2 May 1582. He was imprisoned in the Tower of London, where he apostatized under torture, returning to Protestantism. Released on bond, he then returned to Gloucester.

By the following April he was again at Rheims, and having returned to Catholicism around the beginning of Michaelmas term visited his brother-in-law in Aldersgate Street, London. Around this time he was approached by Captain John Davis requesting an introduction to William Allen. Davis proposed that the ships he had been given by the government for piracy against Spain be crewed by Catholics to serve the Pope or the King of Spain against the Turks or other enemies. Aufield met Davis at Rouen and brought him to Rheims to meet Williams. Davis's plan was conveyed to the Pope, who referred Davis to the King of Spain.

On the failure of the negotiations, Aufield returned to England and was arrested for circulating Catholic texts and sent to the Tower, and again put to torture. Aufield was charged under Religion Act 1580 s.4 which prohibited publication of any book against the queen. He was then transferred to Newgate. He was then tried, convicted and hanged at Tyburn alongside his assistant Thomas Webley. He was beatified in 1929. His feast day is 6 July, the date of his martyrdom.

== See also ==
- Douai Martyrs
