= Edward Jones (martyr) =

Welsh Roman Catholic priest and martyr

Blessed Edward Jones
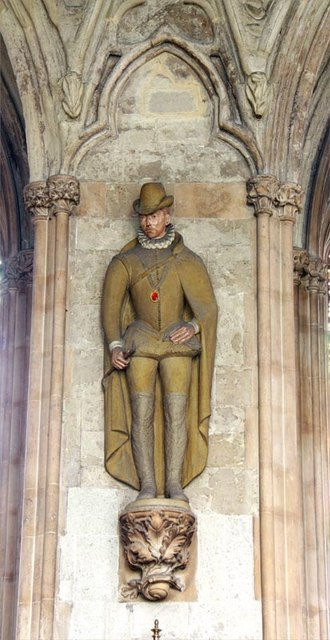
- Statue of Edward Jones in the church of St Etheldreda, Ely Place, London

Martyr
- Born: Llanelidan in Dyffryn Clwyd, Wales
- Died: 6 May 1590; London
- Beatified: 15 December 1929 by Pope Pius XI
- Feast: 6 May

Edward Jones (died 6 May 1590) was a Welsh priest and martyr of the Roman Catholic Church. He has been beatified in 1926 with the other Douai Martyrs.

== Life ==
He was born in Llanelidan in Dyffryn Clwyd. He was baptised an Anglican in the Diocese of St Asaph. He travelled around Europe, and during his travels he became a Catholic.

In 1587, in Reims, he was received into the Catholic Church. He studied to be a priest at Douai College. On 11 June 1588, he was ordained a priest in Loon. In December 1588, he returned to England and stayed for some time in a grocer's shop in Fleet Street.

In 1590, he was arrested in that shop by Richard Topcliffe, "who pretended to be a Catholic." He was taken to the Tower of London and tortured there. At the Old Bailey "he made a skillful and learned defense, pleading that a confession elicited under torture was not legally sufficient to ensure a conviction. The court complimented him on his courageous bearing". Nevertheless, he was convicted of high treason. Together with Anthony Middleton, he was hanged, drawn and quartered on 6 May 1590, opposite the grocer's shop where he had been captured; "over the gallows there was placed an inscription: 'For treason and favouring of foreign invasion'. When he [Jones] protested he was thrown off the scaffold ... and the butchery began".

== Beatification ==
He was beatified on 15 December 1929; his feast day is 6 May.

== See also ==
- Blessed Edward Jones Catholic High School
- Catholic Church in the United Kingdom
