= John Lowe (martyr) =

English Catholic priest and martyr

Blessed John Lowe
- Born: ca. 1553
- Died: 8 October 1586 (aged 32–33); Tyburn, London, England
- Venerated in: Roman Catholic Church (England)
- Beatified: 22 November 1987 by Pope John Paul II

John Lowe (1553–1586) was an English Catholic priest and martyr.

== Life ==
John Lowe was born the youngest son of Simon Lowe and Margaret Lacy of London in 1553. His father was probably the Simon Low, a merchant-tailor and citizen of London. The family were parishioners of the parish of St Magnus the Martyr.

John was for some time a Protestant minister. After his conversion to Catholicism, he studied at Douai. He was a servant at Anchin Abbey for 1578–1579. He entered the English College, Rome, arriving on 19 November 1581, and was ordained a deacon there on 19 August 1582, but there is no record of where and when he was ordained a priest. Leaving Rome in September 1583, he was recorded as leaving Rheims for the mission in England on 20 December 1583. Records show that his absence abroad had been noted by the English government.

By this time his father had died, and his mother Margaret was living on London Bridge. Walking with her nearby one evening in May 1586, he talked too unguardedly about his aspirations to martyrdom and was overheard and denounced to the authorities. He used to frequent the house of a Mr Tremayne in Clerkenwell, and while there he was subsequently arrested. He was taken to the Clink prison on the 11 May. On 8 October 1586 he was executed by hanging, drawing and quartering at Tyburn, was executed along with two fellow priests, John Adams and Robert Dibdale.

All three priests were beatified (the last stage prior to canonisation) by Pope John Paul II on 22 November 1987.

== See also ==
- Catholic Church in the United Kingdom
- Douai Martyrs

== Sources ==
- The most reliable compact source is Godfrey Anstruther, Seminary Priests, St Edmund's College, Ware, vol. 1, 1968, pp. 214–215.
