= John Amias =

English Roman Catholic priest and martyr

Blessed John Amias
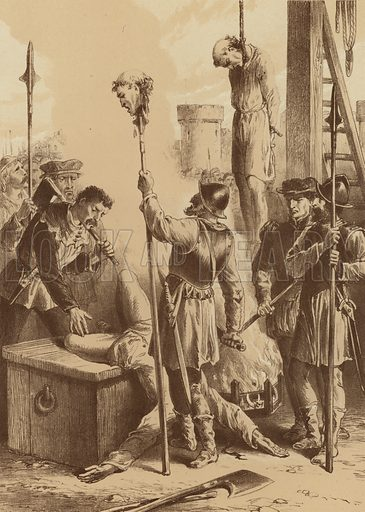
- John Amias and Robert Dalby, "At the place of Execution." Illustration for Memoirs of Missionary Priests by Bishop Challoner (Jack, 1878)
- Born: possibly Wakefield, Yorkshire, England
- Died: 16 March 1589; Outside the city of York
- Beatified: 15 December 1929 by Pope Pius XI
- Feast: 16 March

John Amias (died 16 March 1589) was a Roman Catholic priest who was martyred in England. He was beatified by Pope Pius XI in 1929.

== Life ==
There is some doubt about his early life and his real name. One story is that he was indeed John Amias or Amyas, born at Wakefield in Yorkshire, England, where he married and raised a family, exercising the trade of cloth-merchant. On the death of his wife, he divided his property among his children and left for the Continent to become a priest. There is also a possibility that he was really William Anne (surname), youngest son of John and Katherine Anne, of Frickley near Wakefield.

Regardless of his actual name, on 22 June 1580, a widower calling himself "John Amias" entered the English College at Rheims to study for the priesthood. He was ordained a priest in Rheims Cathedral on 25 March 1581. On 5 June of that year Amias, set out for Paris and then England, as a missionary, in the company of another priest, Edmund Sykes. Of his missionary life we know little. Towards the end of 1588 he was seized at the house of a Mr Murton at Melling in Lancashire and imprisoned in York Castle. Given the 1585 Act making it a capital offence to be a Catholic priest in England the sentence of hanging, drawing and quartering was inevitable. It was carried out outside the city of York on 16 March 1589. Amias was beginning to address the assembled people, and explain that it was for religion, and not treason, that he suffered, but was not allowed to proceed.

His fate was shared by a fellow priest, Robert Dalby. Both were beatified by Pope Pius XI on 15 December 1929.

== See also ==
- Catholic Church in the United Kingdom
- Douai Martyrs

== Sources ==
- Godfrey Anstruther, Seminary Priests, St Edmund's College, Ware, vol. 1, 1968, pp. 7–8.
