= Stephen Rowsham =

English Roman Catholic priest and martyr

Blessed Stephen Rowsham
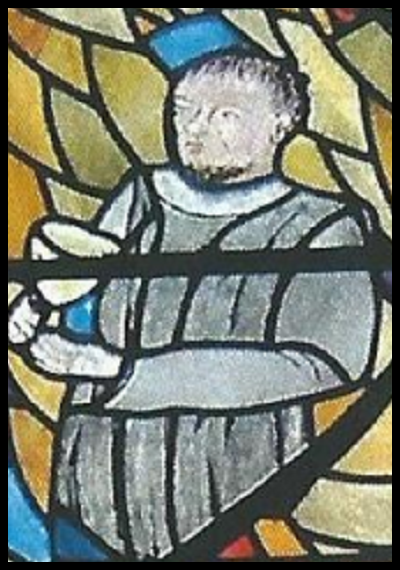
- Blessed Stephen Rowsham - detail from a window at St Thomas's Fairford

Priest and Martyr
- Born: c. 1555; Oxfordshire, England
- Died: 3 April 1587 (aged 31 - 32); Gloucester, England
- Venerated in: Roman Catholic Church
- Beatified: 22 November 1987 by Pope John Paul II
- Feast: 3 April (individual); 29 October (Martyrs of Douai); 4 May (all English Martyrs); 22 November (Eighty-five martyrs of England and Wales)
- Attributes: chalice

Stephen Rowsham (Rousham, Rouse) was an English Catholic priest, executed on 3 April 1587. He is a Catholic martyr, and was beatified by Pope John Paul in 1987.

== Life ==
A native of Oxfordshire, born c. 1555, he entered Oriel College, Oxford, in 1572. He took orders in the English Church, and was Vicar at the University Church of St Mary the Virgin, Oxford about 1578.

Becoming convinced of the truth of the Catholic religion he entered the English College at Reims on 23 April 1581, where he was ordained priest at Michaelmas, and sent on the English mission on 30 April 1582, along with Robert Ludlam.

Rowsham is described as small of stature, with one shoulder higher than the other, with a certain twist to the neck. This made him more easily recognisable and he was arrested almost immediately on landing. He was sent to the Tower of London on 19 May 1582, and remained a prisoner for more than three years, during half of which time (from 14 August 1582 until 12 February 1584) he was confined to the dungeon known as the "Little Ease". On the latter date he was transferred to the Marshalsea, from which prison he was carried into exile in the autumn of 1585.

He arrived at Reims, 8 October, but set out for England again on 7 February 1586. The field of his labours, which were continued for about a year, was in the west of England. He was taken at the house of the Widow Strange in Gloucester. His trial and martyrdom were at Gloucester in March 1586–87. Because of the outcry from spectators when John Sandys was cut down quickly and disemboweled alive, Rowsham was allowed to hang until he was dead.

== See also ==
- Douai Martyrs

== Sources ==
- Edward Rishton, Diarium Turri-Lundin
- John Hungerford Pollen, Acts of the English Martyrs (London, 1891)
- "The Martyrs of England and Wales (1535–1680), Hagiography Circle
