= Anthony Page (priest) =

English Roman Catholic priest and martyr

Blessed Anthony Page
- Born: 1563; Harrow-on-the-Hill, Middlesex,
- Died: 30 April 1593; York
- Venerated in: Roman Catholicism
- Beatified: 22 November on 1987, Rome by Pope Pope John Paul II
- Feast: 4 May

Anthony Page (1563 – April 1593) was an English Catholic priest. He is a Catholic martyr, beatified in 1987.

== Life ==
Page was born at Harrow-on-the-Hill, Middlesex, in 1563. He was of gentle birth and matriculated at Christ Church, Oxford on 23 November 1581. He entered the English College, at Reims on 30 September 1584 along with Joseph Lambton, and received minor orders in April 1585. He was ordained deacon at Laon on 22 September 1590, and priest at Soissons on 21 September 1591. Anthony Champney, who was his contemporary at Reims, in his manuscript history of the reign of Elizabeth I of England, as quoted by Richard Challoner, describes him as "of more than common learning and piety, and as having endeared himself to all by his singular candour of mind and sweetness of behaviour."

On Candlemas 1593, there was a great search for priests ordered in the north, and he was found at Heworth Manor near York, in a hiding place at the bottom of a haystack. He was condemned for being a priest, under the Jesuits, etc. Act 1584, and was hanged, drawn, and quartered at York in 30 April 1593.

Anthony Page was beatified by Pope John Paul II on 22 November 1987 as one of the Eighty-five martyrs of England and Wales, whose feast day is 4 May.

== See also ==
- Catholic Church in the United Kingdom
- Douai Martyrs
