= Christ the Word Catholic School =

Voluntary aided school in Denbighshire, Wales

- Ysgol Uwchradd Crist Y Gair

Location
- Cefndy Road; Rhyl, Denbighshire, LL18 2EU; United Kingdom; 53°18′53″N 03°28′40″W

Information
- Type: Voluntary Aided
- Religious affiliation: Catholic
- Established: September 1965
- Local authority: Denbighshire
- Department for Education URN: 6635902 Tables
- Headteacher: Amanda Preston
- Gender: Co-educational
- Age: 3 to 16
- Website: ChristtheWord.co.uk

Christ the Word Catholic School is a Catholic co-educational voluntary aided secondary school situated on Cefndy Road, in Rhyl, Denbighshire. It opened in September 2019 and is an English-medium school. It replaced both a secondary school, Blessed Edward Jones Catholic School and primary school, Ysgol Mair, meaning that it teaches pupils from ages 3 to 16.

It was one of three Catholic secondary schools in the Roman Catholic Diocese of Wrexham, the others being St Joseph's Catholic & Anglican High School, Wrexham, and St Richard Gwyn Catholic High School, Flint.

== History ==
=== Blessed Edward Jones Catholic High School ===
In September 1965, Blessed Edward Jones School was founded to provide education for children of Catholic families in Rhyl, Colwyn Bay, and Llandudno. It is situated next to a feeder primary school, Ysgol Mair.

It was named after Blessed Edward Jones, who was a Welsh Catholic martyr in the 16th century, who baptised an Anglican, before becoming a Catholic priest.

In October 2012, it was inspected by Estyn who reported that its performance was Good. In 2019, it was replaced by Christ the Word School.

=== Christ the Word Catholic School ===
In 2013, plans were made by Denbighshire County Council, the local education authority, to build a new dual faith school for Anglicans and replace the existing Catholic schools in the county. Originally, the plan was to merge Blessed Edward Jones, Ysgol Mair in Rhyl and St Brigid's School in Denbigh, and include the Anglican Diocese of St Asaph. Later, the Diocese of St Asaph pulled out of the plans as did St Brigid's School.

The name of the new school became Christ the Word Catholic School. It opened in 2019 and is built on the site of Blessed Edward Jones and Ysgol Mair, replacing the two schools. It teaches pupils aged 3 to 16 years old. The cost of the building was £23 million and was being built by Kier Construction. It has capacity for 920 pupils, 420 pupils for 3 to 11 and 500 pupils for ages 11 to 16.

The facilities in the school include a theatre, assembly hall, domestic science room, four-court sports hall, a chapel, small hall and an external dining area. Outdoors there is a sports pitch and an all weather pitch.

== Notable former pupils ==
- Carol Vorderman, television personality/presenter
- Chris Ruane, Labour MP for the Vale of Clwyd constituency (1997-2015)
- David Harrison, jockey, who was British flat racing Champion Apprentice in 1992.
- Barry Hilton, South African Comedian
