= Thomas Tunstall =

English Roman Catholic priest and martyr

Blessed Thomas Tunstall

Martyr
- Born: Lancashire, England
- Died: 13 July 1616; Just outside of the King's Lynn's Magdalen Gate.
- Venerated in: Roman Catholic Church
- Beatified: 15 December 1929 by Pope Pius XI
- Feast: 13 July

Thomas Tunstall (Tunstal) (executed at Norwich, 13 July 1616) was an English Roman Catholic priest. He is a Catholic martyr, beatified in 1929.

== Life ==
Tunstall was born in Lancashire. He was descended from the Tunstalls of Thurland Castle, a Lancashire family who afterwards settled in Yorkshire. In the Douay Diaries he is called by the alias of Helmes and is described as Carleolensis, that is, born within the ancient Diocese of Carlisle.

He took the college oath at Douay on 24 May 1607; received minor orders at Arras, 13 June 1609, and the subdiaconate at Douay on 24 June following. The diary does not record his ordination to the diaconate or priesthood, but he left the college as a priest on 17 August 1610.

On reaching England he was almost immediately apprehended and spent four or five years in various prisons till he succeeded in escaping from Wisbech Castle. He made his way to a friend's house near King's Lynn. His hands were injured in the escape, and when he sought medical help he came to the attention of the authorities and he was recaptured and committed to Norwich Gaol. At the next assizes he was tried and condemned. He was hanged, drawn and quartered just outside of the city's Magdalen Gate.

There is a contemporary portrait of the martyr at Stonyhurst, showing him as a man still young with abundant black hair and dark moustache.

== See also ==
- Douai Martyrs
