= Ralph Crockett =

English Roman Catholic priest and martyr

Blessed Ralph Crockett
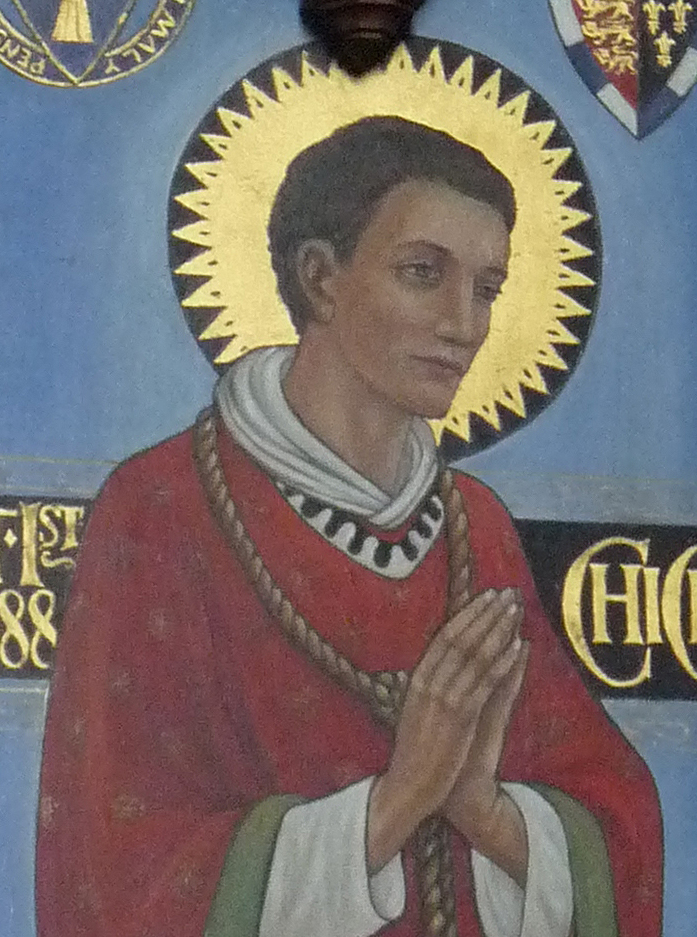
- St Joseph's Church, Sale, Cheshire.

Martyr
- Born: c. 1522; Barton, near Farndon, Cheshire
- Died: 1 October 1588; Chichester. West Sussex, England
- Honored in: Roman Catholic Church
- Beatified: 15 December 1929 by Pope Pius XI
- Feast: 1 October

Ralph Crockett (b. at Barton, near Farndon, Cheshire 1522; executed at Chichester, 1 October 1588) was an English Roman Catholic priest. He is a Catholic martyr, beatified in 1929.

== Life ==
Educated at Christ's College, Cambridge, Crockett became a schoolmaster in Norfolk for a year before going to Gloucester Hall, Oxford. After a year, he went to Ipswich, where he was a schoolmaster for five years. In 1581, persecutions increased after the death of Edmund Campion, so he withdrew to Cheshire for about two years.

In 1584, he left for France, and began studies at the English College then located at Rheims. He was ordained at Rheims in 1585, and continued his studies for a year, but his health being compromised, he asked to return to England. He and three other priests, Thomas Bramston, George Potter, and Edward James, left from Dieppe, but the ship ran ashore 19 April 1586 at Littlehampton, Sussex, a place as carefully watched as any in the kingdom.

== Martyrdom ==
After the failure of the Spanish Armada, the English Government took severe measures against some of the Catholic priests in its custody. Crockett and James with two others, John Oven and Francis Edwardes, were selected for trial, which took place at Chichester on 30 September 1588. Crockett, James and Edwardes were condemned to death, under the Jesuits, etc. Act 1584, for being priests and coming into the realm; but Oven on taking the Oath of Supremacy was respited.

Crockett ascended the scaffold and blessed the crowd in Latin which brought shouts of anger upon him, however he changed into praying in English whereupon the crowd cheered. James and Crockett faced their deaths without fear and were executed after absolving each other.

== Legacy and beatification ==
Crockett's father Adam, in his later years entered the Catholic Church on the Continent and his descendants remained recusant and continued to practise their Catholic faith in the face of continued persecution.

In 1929 Crockett was beatified by Pope Pius XI. His feast day is 1 October. He is depicted in stained glass by Margaret Agnes Rope in the "English Mission Window" of Shrewsbury Cathedral and the "English Martyrs Window" of the Church of the Holy Name in Oxton, Wirral.

== See also ==
- Douai Martyrs
