= John Shert =

English Roman Catholic priest and martyr

Blessed John Shert

Martyr
- Born: Shert Hall near Macclesfield, Cheshire
- Died: 28 May 1582; Tyburn, London, England
- Beatified: 29 December 1886 by Pope Leo XIII
- Feast: 28 May

John Shert was an English Catholic priest and martyr, who was executed during the reign of Elizabeth I.

== Background ==
With the notable exceptions of the martyrdom of Cuthbert Mayne and several others the bloody persecution of Catholics under Queen Elizabeth I did not begin in earnest until more than 20 years into her reign. The frenzy of persecution was triggered by real conspiracies to remove the Queen, by her excommunication by Pope Pius V and by the hysteria that accompanied the arrival of the Jesuit St Edmund Campion on the English Mission in 1580. St Edmund and his colleagues brought to an end prevailing confusion over whether Catholics could in good conscience obey laws that compelled them to attend new Anglican services. Catholics were assured that they could not.

== Life ==
John Shert was born at Shert Hall near Macclesfield, Cheshire, and received his degree from Brasenose College, Oxford, in 1566. A convert, he worked as a schoolmaster in London, then as servant to Dr Thomas Stapleton in Douai, before entering the seminary in 1576, where he was ordained a subdeacon. He attended the English College in Rome, where he was ordained to the priesthood. He then returned to the English College, which, by then, had relocated to Rheims. On 27 August 1579, he left Rheims for England, where, he worked in London and Cheshire for two years before he was arrested and sent to the Tower of London on 14 July 1581.

He was one of 20 who stood trial in Westminster Hall, London, for treason in the fictitious "Rome and Rheims Plot" against Queen Elizabeth I. He was brought before the Queen's Bench on 16 November, on an absurd charge of conspiracy. Although he could amply demonstrate that he was in England when the plot was allegedly hatched he, like all the other priests, was convicted. He was the second of three priests to die at Tyburn on 28 May 1582 and was made to watch as the first, Thomas Ford, was butchered, shouting with arms outspread: "O happy Thomas! You have run that happy race. You blessed soul, pray for me".

When it was his turn to die, Shert rejected an invitation from the Sheriff to request the Queen's forgiveness on the grounds that he was guilty of no offence.

Along with Thomas Ford and Robert Johnson, he was executed on 28 May 1582. All three were beatified in 1886.

== See also ==
- Catholic Church in the United Kingdom
- Douai Martyrs
