= Robert Johnson (martyr) =

English Roman Catholic priest and martyr

Blessed Robert Johnson

Martyr
- Born: Shropshire, England
- Died: 28 May 1582; Tyburn, London, England
- Beatified: 29 December 1886 by Pope Leo XIII
- Feast: 28 May

Robert Johnson, a Shropshire native, was a Catholic priest and martyr during the reign of Elizabeth I.

== Life ==
Robert Johnson had grown up in one of the four parishes of Claverley, Hales, Owen or Worfield in what was then the Anglican Diocese of Worcester. In his youth he was a servant in a gentleman's household.

He joined the German College in Rome on 1 October 1571. He was ordained a priest in Brussels from the English College, Douai. After a pilgrimage to Rome in 1579 he returned to England in 1580, was arrested on 12 July and put in the Poultry Counter. Johnson was transferred to the Tower on 5 December, racked on 16 December, and put in a dungeon until his trial on 14 November 1581.

Johnson was one of 19 priests who stood trial with St Edmund Campion in Westminster Hall in the late autumn of 1581. They were charged with treason under an Act of 1351 that did not pertain to religion but to a fictitious conspiracy against the Queen known as the "Plot of Rome and Rheims". The purpose was to send out the message that the priests were not condemned for their faith but for conspiring against the Queen, an accusation which they adamantly denied. He was subsequently condemned on 20 November and executed along with Thomas Ford and John Shert on 28 May 1582. Johnson was the last to die, after being forced to watch the quartering of Shert. Johnson began to pray in Latin and was bidden by a minister to "Pray as Christ taught." Johnson answered, "What! Do you think Christ taught in English?" All three were beatified in 1889.

== See also ==
- Douai Martyrs
