= Robert Dibdale =

English Roman Catholic priest and martyr

Blessed Robert Dibdale
- Born: c.1556 Shottery, Stratford-upon-Avon
- Died: 8 October 1586 (aged 29–30); Tyburn
- Venerated in: Roman Catholic Church
- Beatified: 22 November 1987 beatified by Pope John Paul II

Robert Dibdale (or Debdale) (ca. 1556 – 8 October 1586) was an English Catholic priest and martyr.

== Biography ==
Dibdale was born the son of John Dibdale of Shottery, a village in the county of Warwickshire, within the parish of Stratford-upon-Avon, the birthplace of William Shakespeare's wife Anne Hathaway, at a date unknown. He had a brother, Richard, and two sisters, Joan and Agnes. It would seem the family were Catholics. Peter Ackroyd speculates that Dibdale (or Debdale) attended the King's New School in Stratford, the same grammar school attended by William Shakespeare.

Government records show that in 1581 his absence abroad at Louvain since about 1576 had been noted by the English authorities. Catholic records show that, by that time, he had already been to Rome and had then gone to the English College in Rheims, France, arriving there on 29 December 1579, before setting out for England on 22 June 1580. At that point, he had still not been ordained.

Dibdale was immediately arrested upon landing at Dover. It is recorded that he was committed to the Gatehouse by 29 July the same year. While in prison his father sent him bread, cheese, and five shillings. He was discharged on 10 September 1582. His whereabouts immediately thereafter are obscure but on 14 March 1583, he again entered the English College at Rheims and was ordained a priest in Rheims Cathedral on 31 March 1584.

Using the alias Palmer, he set out for England the following 2 August. He served as chaplain at the Manor of Denham in Buckinghamshire. Denham was held by Edmund Peckham, whose wife Dorothy was the sister of John Gerard SJ. Dibdale was arrested near Tothill Street in London on 24 July 1586, and was imprisoned, first at the Counter, then at Newgate. Given the 1585 Act making it a capital offence to be a Catholic priest in England, the sentence of hanging, drawing and quartering was inevitable. It was carried out at Tyburn on 8 October 1586. His fate was shared by two fellow priests, John Adams and John Lowe.

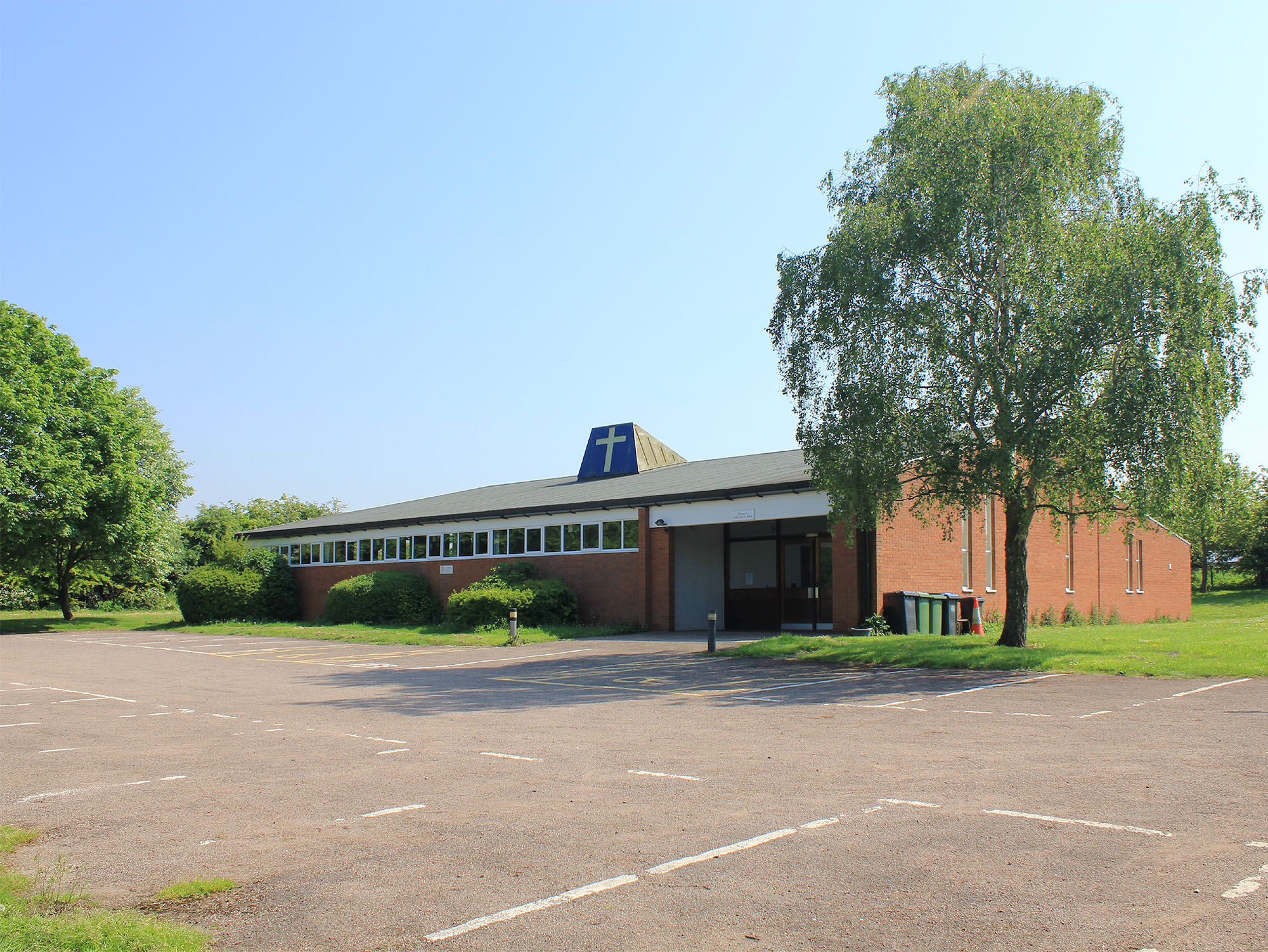
Roman Catholic Church of Our Lady of Peace and Blessed Robert Dibdale

All three priests were beatified (the last stage prior to canonisation) by Pope John Paul II on 22 November 1987.

In 1998, the Catholic church in his home village, the Church of Our Lady Peace (opened in 1973), was rededicated to Our Lady of Peace and Blessed Robert Dibdale.

== See also ==
- Douai Martyrs
- Eighty-five martyrs of England and Wales

== Sources ==
- Anstruther, Godfrey. Seminary Priests, St Edmund's College, Ware, vol. 1 (1968), p.101.
- Brownlow, Frank W. Shakespeare, Harsnett, and the devils of Denham, University of Delaware Press (1993), pp.167–168.
