= Edward Waterson =

English Roman Catholic priest and martyr

Blessed Edward Waterson
- Born: London
- Died: 7 January 1594; Newcastle upon Tyne
- Venerated in: Roman Catholicism

Edward Waterson (? – 7 January 1594 (NS)) was an English Catholic priest and martyr. He served the hidden Catholics in England during the reign of Elizabeth I. Edward was arrested in 1593 and executed at Newcastle upon Tyne. He was beatified in 1929.

== Life ==
Born in London, Waterson was brought up in the Church of England. As a young man he travelled to Turkey with some English merchants. In 1588, on his return, he stopped in Rome and was brought into the Catholic Church there by Richard Smith. The Pilgrim-book of the English College records his stay there, 29 November-11 December, 1588. Waterson proceeded to the English College at Reims, arriving there 24 January, 1589. He received the tonsure and minor orders on 18 August, 1590, subdiaconate on 21 September, 1591, diaconate on 24 February, 1592, and was ordained priest 11 March 1592.

In summer 1592 Waterson returned to England, where legal restrictions on Catholics were severe, in order to minister to hidden Catholics. Joseph Lambton, a young Catholic priest who was on the same ship, was arrested upon landing, but Waterson escaped. However, he was captured by the authorities in midsummer 1593. Lambton was executed 31 July 1592. The sheriff then took part of the quartered remains and showed them to Waterson in an effort to frighten him, but Waterson viewed them as holy relics. Waterson was held until just after Christmas (OS), when he was hanged, drawn and quartered, as a traitor. When he was tied to the hurdle to be drawn to the place of execution, the horse would not move, so he had to be brought on foot. While incarcerated in the Newgate prison, Newcastle, he had attempted to escape by burning down his cell door.

== See also ==
- Catholic Church in the United Kingdom
- Douai Martyrs
