= John Adams (Catholic martyr) =

English Catholic priest and martyr, born 1543

Blessed John Adams
- Born: ca. 1543; Winterborne St Martin, Dorset, England
- Died: 8 October 1586 (aged 42–43); Tyburn, London, England
- Venerated in: Roman Catholic Church (England)
- Beatified: 22 November 1987 by Pope John Paul II

John Adams (ca. 1543 – 8 October 1586) was an English Catholic priest and martyr.

== Life ==
He was born at Winterborne St Martin in Dorset at an unknown date (ca. 1543?) and became a Protestant minister. He later entered the Catholic Church and travelled to the English College then at Rheims, arriving on 7 December 1579. He was ordained a priest at Soissons on 17 December 1580. He set out for the mission in England on 29 March 1581, but returned to Rheims and again set out for England on 18 June 1583.

He is known to have worked in Hampshire but details of his later, as of his earlier life, are patchy. It may be that he was taken prisoner at Rye only a short time after landing in England and that he escaped. In 1583 he was described as a man of "about forty years of age, of average height, with a dark beard, a sprightly look and black eyes. He was a very good controversialist, straightforward, very pious, and pre-eminently a man of hard work. He laboured very strenuously at Winchester and in Hampshire, where he helped many, especially of the poorer classes."

Captured at Winchester, he was brought to London and arrived at the Marshalsea prison on 7 March 1584. His sentence this time was banishment and he was expelled on 15 September 1585 with some seventy-two other priests. Landing at Boulogne, he arrived at Rheims in France on 14 November 1585, but then immediately set out for England again. He was arrested at Winchester as he stepped out of his house, and this time taken to the Clink in London on 19 December 1585. This time, as was to be expected, he was not treated so lightly, especially since that year an Act had been passed which made it a capital offence to be a Catholic priest in England. The sentence of hanging, drawing and quartering was carried out at Tyburn, London on 8 October 1586. His fate was shared by two fellow priests, John Lowe and Robert Dibdale, and possibly his own brother, a layman. This latter fact is not certain and the forename is not in any case known.

All three priests were beatified (the last stage prior to canonisation) by Pope John Paul II on 22 November 1987.

== See also ==
- Catholic Church in the United Kingdom
- Douai Martyrs
- Eighty-five martyrs of England and Wales

== Sources ==
- Godfrey Anstruther, Seminary Priests, St Edmund's College, Ware, vol. 1, 1968, pp. 1–2.
