= Everald Hanse =

English Roman Catholic priest and martyr

Blessed Everald (Everard) Hanse
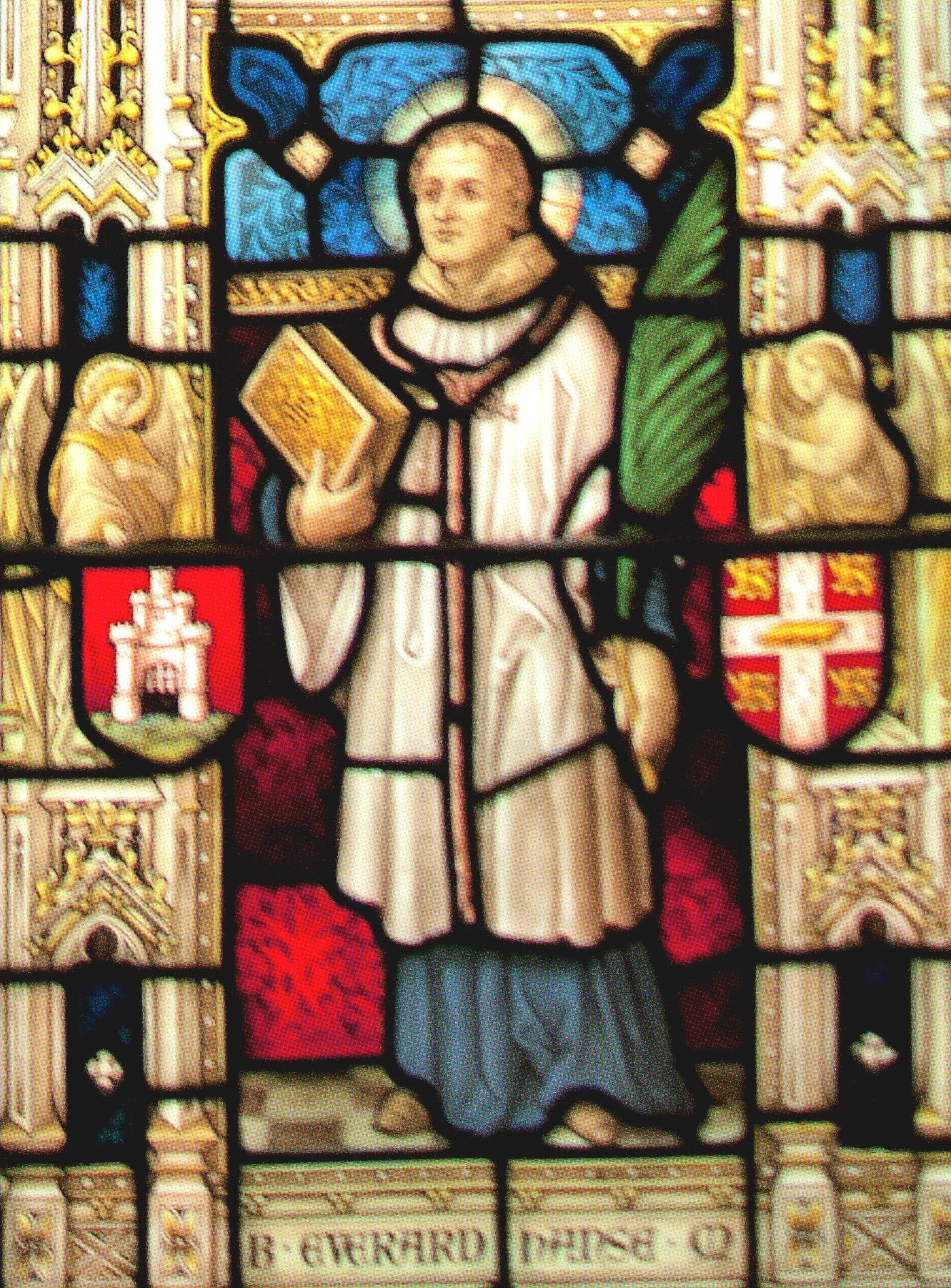
- Stained glass from St Edmund's College Ware

Martyr
- Born: Northamptonshire, England
- Died: 31 July 1581; Tyburn, London, England
- Honored in: Catholic Church
- Beatified: 29 December 1886 by Pope Leo XIII
- Feast: 31 July
- Attributes: Book, noose in neck, martyr's palm

Everald Hanse (died 31 July 1581) was an English priest and a martyr of the Roman Catholic Church.

== Life ==
Everald Hanse was born in Northamptonshire and educated at Cambridge. A Protestant, he was soon presented to a good living as an Anglican clergyman. His brother William, who had become a Catholic priest in April 1579, tried to convert him, but in vain, until a sharp attack of illness made Everald reconsider his position. He then resigned his rich preferments, and travelled to the English College in Reims in northern France (1580–1581) to study for the Catholic priesthood. He was ordained on 25 March 1581 and returned, but his ministry was very short.

In July he was visiting in disguise some Catholic prisoners in London's Marshalsea prison, when the keeper noticed that his shoes were of foreign make. Under questioning, his status as a Catholic priest was discovered, but was not illegal in England at the time. He was asked in court at the Newgate Sessions, what he thought of the pope's authority, and on his admitting that he believed him "to have the same authority now as he had a hundred years before", he was further asked whether the pope had not erred (i.e. sinned) in declaring Queen Elizabeth I excommunicated, to which he answered, "I hope not." His words were at once written down as his indictment, and when he was further asked whether he wished others to believe as he did, he said "I would have all to believe the Catholic faith as I do." A second count was then added that he desired to make others also traitors like himself. He was at once found guilty of "persuasion" which was high treason. He was therefore in due course sentenced and executed at Tyburn on 31 July 1581.

The trial was so badly received that the Government had afterwards to change the methods employed in obtaining sentences. The martyr's last words were "O happy day!" and his constancy throughout "was a matter of great edification to the good". The Spanish ambassador wrote: "Two nights after his death, there was not a particle of earth on which his blood had been shed, which had not been carried off as a relic."

== See also ==
- Catholic Church in the United Kingdom
- Douai Martyrs
