= John Bodey =

English Roman Catholic academic and martyr

Blessed John Bodey

Martyr
- Born: c. 1549; Wells, Somerset
- Died: 2 November 1583 (aged 33–34); Andover, England
- Honored in: Roman Catholicism
- Beatified: 15 December 1929 by Pope Pius XI
- Feast: 2 November

John Bodey (1549 – 2 November 1583) was an English Catholic academic jurist and lay theologian. He was martyred in 1583, and beatified in 1929.

== Life ==
John Bodey was born in Wells, Somerset, in 1549. His father was a wealthy merchant. He studied at Winchester College and New College, Oxford, of which he became a Fellow in 1568 and took an M.A. degree in February 1576. In June 1576, he and seven others were deprived of their fellowships by the visitor, Robert Horne, Bishop of Winchester, and expelled.

The following year he went to Douay College to study civil law, but returned to England in February 1578. Upon his return, he became a schoolmaster in Hampshire. Arrested in 1580, he was kept in iron shackles in Winchester gaol, and was condemned in April 1583, together with John Slade, a schoolmaster, for high treason by denying the Royal Supremacy. There was apparently a feeling that this sentence was unjust and illegal, and they were retried—and condemned again—at Andover, Hampshire, in August 1583.

Bodey had a controversy with Lawrence Humphrey, Dean of Winchester, on the Nicene Council, and his notes from Eusebius still exist. After his second trial, he wrote from prison to Dr. Humphrey Ely, "We consider that iron for this cause borne on earth shall surmount gold and, precious stones in Heaven. That is our mark, that is our desire. In the mean season we are threatened daily, and do look still when the hurdle shall be brought to the door. I beseech you, for God's sake, that we want not the good prayers of you all for our strength, our joy, and our perseverance unto the end. ... From our school of patience the 16th September, 1583."

Bodey was hanged, drawn and quartered at Andover on 2 November 1583. At his execution, he said:

Indeede, I have been sufficiently censured, for I have been condemned twice; if you may make the hearing of a Blessed Mass treason, or the saying of an Ave Maria treason, you may make what you please treason... I acknowledge her as my Lawful Queen in all temporal causes, and none other... Ye shall understand, good people all, I suffer death not for not granting her Majestie to be supreme head of Christ's Church in England, which I may not and will not grant; I pray God long to preserve her Majestie in tranquility over you, even Queen Elizabeth, your queen and mine; I desire you to obey none other.

Bodey's brother Gilbert was arrested with Alexander Briant on 28 April 1581. He was scourged at Bridewell and afterwards confined at one of the Counter Prisons. He was released on bond, and when not called to appear, escaped to Rheims.

== John Slade ==
Blessed John Slade

Martyr
- Died: 30 October 1583; Winchester, England
- Honored in: Roman Catholicism
- Beatified: 15 December 1929 by Pope Pius XI
- Feast: 30 October

Like Bodey, Slade attended the New College, Oxford until, being expelled for being Catholic, he traveled to Douai to take the study of law. However, since as a Catholic he was not permitted to practice, he became a tutor in a gentleman's household in Dorset. Slade was eventually arrested and confined with Bodey at Winchester. Slade was hanged, drawn, and quartered at Winchester 30 October 1583.

== See also ==
- Catholic Church in the United Kingdom
- Douai Martyrs

== Sources ==
- Account of the trial and execution of John Slade, schoolmaster, and John Body, M.A., by R. B. (London, 1583);
- Richard Challoner, Memoirs;
- Nicholas Sanders, Anglican Schism, ed. Lewis (London, 1877);
- J. B. Wainewright, Two English Martyrs: Body and Munden (London, Catholic Truth Society);
- Thomas Francis Knox, Douay Diaries (London, 1878);
- William Allen, A true, sincere, and modest defence of English Catholiques (Reims, 1584)

Attribution
