= Thomas Maxfield =

English Roman Catholic priest and martyr

Blessed Thomas Maxfield
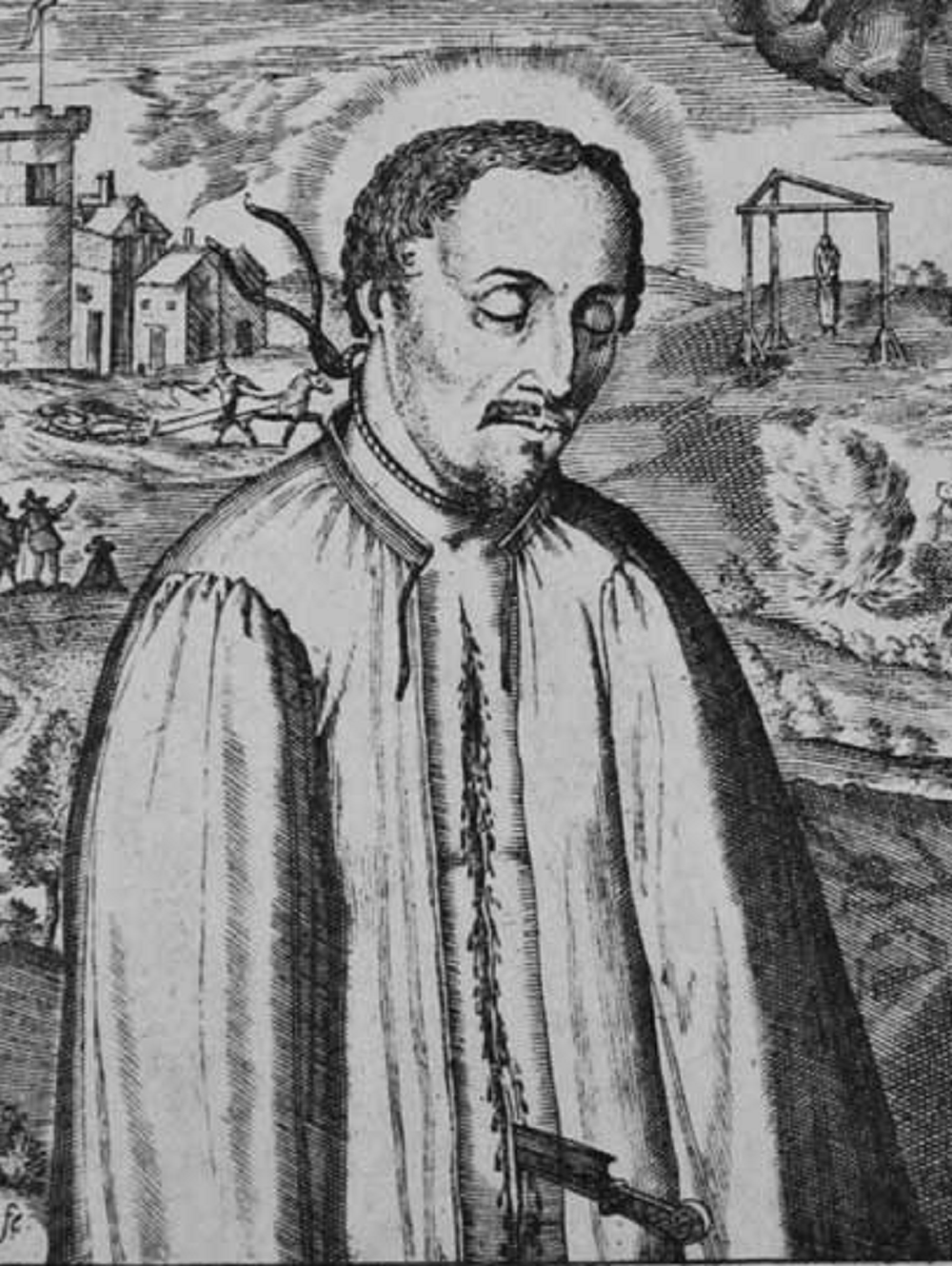
- Spanish print commemorating the martyrdom of Thomas Maxfield, c. 1621: London, Archives of the Archdiocese of Westminster

Martyr
- Born: c.1590 Stafford gaol, Staffordshire, England
- Died: 1 July 1616 (aged 25 - 26); Tyburn, London, England
- Honored in: Roman Catholic Church
- Beatified: 15 December 1929 by Pope Pius XI
- Feast: 1 July

Thomas Maxfield (real name Macclesfield) (c.1590 – 1 July 1616) was an English Roman Catholic priest. He is a Catholic martyr, beatified in 1929.

== Life ==
He was born in Stafford gaol, one of the younger sons of William Macclesfield of Chesterton and Maer and Aston, Staffordshire; William Macclesfield was a Catholic recusant, condemned to death in 1587 for harbouring priests, one of whom was his brother Humphrey. His mother was Ursula, daughter of Francis Roos, of Laxton, Nottinghamshire. William Macclesfield is said to have died in prison and is one of the prætermissi as William Maxfield; but, as his death occurred in 1608, this is doubtful.

Thomas arrived at the English College at Douai on 16 March 1602–3, but had to return to England 17 May 1610, owing to ill health. In 1614 he went back to Douai, was ordained priest, and in the next year came to London.

Within three months of landing he was arrested, and sent to the Gatehouse, Westminster. After about eight months' imprisonment, he tried to escape by a rope let down from the window in his cell, but was captured on reaching the ground. This was at midnight 14–15 June 1616. For seventy hours he was placed in the stocks in a dungeon at the Gatehouse, and was then on Monday night (17 June) removed to Newgate Jail, where he was amongst criminals.

On Wednesday, 26 June, he was brought to the bar at the Old Bailey, and the next day was condemned solely for being a priest, under the Jesuits, etc. Act 1584. The Spanish ambassador, Diego Sarmiento de Acuña, Count of Gondomar, did his best to obtain a pardon, or at least a reprieve; but, finding his efforts unavailing, had solemn exposition of the Blessed Sacrament in his chapel during Maxfield's last night on earth.

Maxfield was condemned to be executed at Tyburn, London. The procession to Tyburn early on the following morning was joined by many devout Spaniards, who, in spite of mockery, formed a guard of honour. Tyburn-tree itself was found decorated with garlands. Catholics retrieved his relics from the pit in which they were interred beneath the bodies of two criminals in London in 1616 and Gondomar arranged their safe passage to Spain.

Half of Maxfield's relics are now at Downside Abbey, near Bath. Others are located in the Santa Ana chapel of the Paza de Gondomar.

== See also ==
- Douai Martyrs
