= Joseph Lambton =

English Catholic priest

Blessed Joseph Lambton
- Born: Malton-in-Rydale, Yorkshire
- Died: 31 July 1592; Newcastle-upon-Tyne
- Venerated in: Catholic Church
- Beatified: 22 November on 1987, Rome by Pope Pope John Paul II
- Feast: 4 May

Joseph Lambton (1569–1592) was an English Catholic priest. He is honoured as a Catholic martyr, beatified in 1987.

== Life ==
Member of a prominent Durham family, Joseph Lambton was the second son of Thomas Lambton of Malton-in-Rydale, Yorkshire, and Katharine, daughter of Robert Birkhead of West Brandon, Durham. Joseph's maternal uncle, George Birkhead was Archpriest in England from 1608 to 1614.

In September 1584 Thomas was admitted to the English College, then at Reims, along with Anthony Page and two others. It was while he was at Reims, that Parliament passed legislation by which priests and religious entering the realm were to be deemed traitors unless, within three days of their arrival, they had taken the Oath of Supremacy before a Justice of the Peace.

In August 1589 he went to the English College, Rome. Eager to go on the English mission, he was allowed to curtail his theological course, and was ordained priest in the Lateran Basilica on 28 March 1592, with a dispensation as Lambton was two months short of the canonical age. He left for England to work in Westmorland on 22 April 1592. He was arrested at Newcastle soon after landing and condemned with Edward Waterson, at the next assizes under the Jesuits, etc. Act 1584.

To avoid a crowd, the execution was scheduled for early Monday rather than the previous Saturday. It was decided that Lambton should be executed alone, and Waterson given a brief reprieve to allow him time to consider changing his views. Lambton was cut down alive, and the hangman refused to complete the sentence, which was carried out by a Frenchman practicing as a surgeon at Kenton. The sheriff then took part of the remains and showed them to Waterson in an effort to frighten him, but Waterson viewed them as holy relics.

The Venerable English College at Rome places it on Monday, 31 July 1592, "the execution having been postponed from the previous Saturday because of fear of 'a great multitude of people". According to the Diocese of Hexham and Newcastle, Lambton was executed on the Town Moor in Newcastle on 27 July 1593.

== Veneration ==
Joseph Lambton was beatified by Pope John Paul II on 22 November 1987 as one of the Eighty-five martyrs of England and Wales.

== See also ==
- Douai Martyrs
- Jesuits, etc. Act 1584

== Sources ==
Attribution

- The entry cites:
  - Catholic Record Society's Publications (London, 1905–), V, 212, 228, 231, 293;
  - Richard Challoner, Missionary Priests, I, 298.
