= Luke Kirby (priest) =

English Roman Catholic saint

Saint Luke Kirby
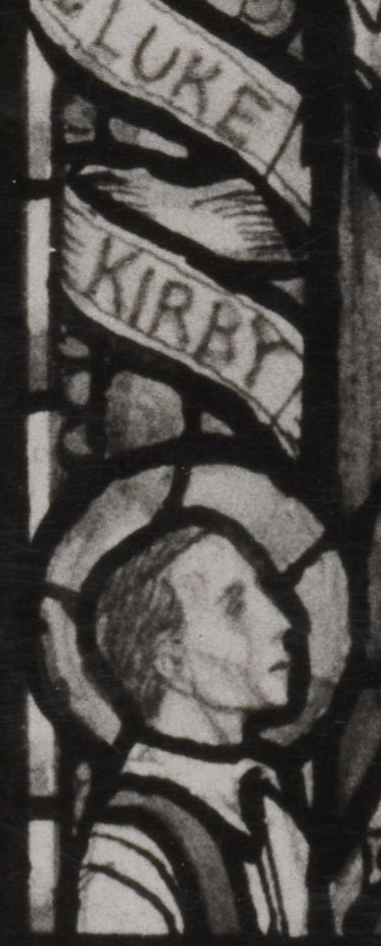
- Detail of a sketch of a stained glass window for Notre Dame Convent, Wigan, England

Martyr
- Born: c. 1549 probably near Richmond, Yorkshire, England
- Died: 30 May 1582 (aged 32 - 33); Tyburn, London, England
- Venerated in: Roman Catholic Church
- Beatified: 29 December 1886 by Pope Leo XIII
- Canonized: 25 October 1970 by Pope Paul VI
- Feast: 30 May (individual with his three companions); 25 October (with the Forty Martyrs of England and Wales); 29 October (one of the Douai Martyrs)
- Attributes: martyr's palm, book of hours

Luke Kirby (also Kirbie c. 1549 – 30 May 1582) was an English Catholic priest and martyr from the North of England, executed during the reign of Elizabeth I. He is one of the Forty Martyrs of England and Wales.

== Early life ==
Kirby was born in Richmond, North Yorkshire. He is said to have received his M.A. in England, probably at Cambridge, before converting to Catholicism at Louvain and entering Douai College in 1576. He was ordained a priest at Cambrai in September 1577 and left Rheims for England on 3 May 1578; however, he returned on 15 July and went to Rome. There he took the college oath at the English College, Rome, on 23 April 1579. It was in Rome that he met the spy/informer Anthony Munday, who later gave false testimony against him.

== Mission ==
He was chosen to accompany Campion and Ralph Sherwin on their way to England, and the three set out from Rome on 14 April 1580, arriving in Rheims on 31 May. On 16 June he left Rheims with William Hartley. They made the journey to the coast by Douay and Dunkirk on foot.

== Arrest ==
In June 1580, he was arrested on landing at Dover, and committed to the Gatehouse, Westminster. On 4 December, he was transferred to the Tower, where he was subjected to the torture known as the "Scavenger's Daughter" for more than an hour on 9 December. Luke Kirby was tried at the same time as Edmund Campion, on the same charge of treason against the Queen, but his execution was deferred to the following May, and took place immediately after that of William Filby.

== Execution ==
Kirby was condemned on 17 November 1581, and from 2 April until the day he died, he was put in irons. With him at Tyburn died a Jesuit priest, Thomas Cottam, and two seminary priests: Lawrence Richardson and William Filby on 30 May 1582.

All were later beatified equipollently in 1886 by Pope Leo XIII. He was canonized as one of the Forty Martyrs of England and Wales in 1970.

== Legacy and relic ==
A relic, a corporal, which is housed in the English College in Rome, has the names of five priests. Kirby is one of those names stitched in the cloth.

A book entitled "Blessed Luke Kirby: Priest and Martyr" was written by Michael TH Banks, and published nine months before the martyr's eventual canonization.

A portion of a stained glass window in St. Edmund's College, Ware depicts him.
