= Edmund Catherick =

English Roman Catholic priest

Blessed Edmund Catherick

Martyr
- Born: c. 1605; Lancashire, England
- Died: 13 April 1642 (aged 36 - 37); York, England
- Beatified: 15 December 1929 by Pope Pius XI
- Feast: 13 April

Edmund Catherick (c. 1605 – 13 April 1642) was an English Roman Catholic priest. He is a Catholic martyr, beatified in 1929.

== Life ==
Catherick was probably born in Lancashire about 1605. He was descended from the Catholic family of Catherick of Carlton, North Yorkshire and Stanwick, in the North Riding of Yorkshire. Educated at Douai College, he was ordained in the same institution, and about 1635 went out to the English mission where he began his seven years' ministry which closed with his death. During this time he was known under the alias Huddleston, which was probably his mother's maiden name.

Apprehended in the North Riding, near Watlas, Catherick was brought by pursuivants before Justice Dodsworth, a connection by marriage – possibly an uncle. Gillow states that it was through admissions made to Dodsworth, under the guise of friendship, that Catherick was convicted. He was arraigned at York and condemned to death together with John Lockwood.

The execution was stayed by the king Charles I of England for a short time, but he finally signed the warrant and it was carried out during his presence at The Manor in York. Catherick and Lockwood were dragged through the streets of York on a hurdle to the place of execution and hanged, drawn, and quartered. Catherick's head was placed on Micklegate Bar. What remained of the body was buried at Toft Green and later taken to St. Gregory's Monastery, Downside. The skull, said to have been found at Hazlewood Castle, was examined by John Lingard in 1845.

== See also ==
- Catholic Church in the United Kingdom
- Douai Martyrs
