= Ingrid Holford =

English meteorologist and author

Ingrid Holford (née Bianchi, 1920–2012) was an English meteorologist and author. After graduating from University College London with a degree in economics, she was trained as a weather forecaster for the Women's Auxiliary Air Force during World War II. She was a fellow of the Royal Meteorological Society and published articles and books on weather.

== Early life and education ==
Ingrid Bianchi was born on 10 January 1920. She attended Cheltenham Ladies' College and earned her first class honours B.S. in economics from University College London in 1941. She worked briefly as a statistician for the Central Statistical Office in London.

== World War II ==
In 1942, Holford answered an advertisement for science graduates to train in weather forecasting for the Women's Auxiliary Air Force (WAAF) during World War II. She had a direct entry commission and trained in theory at the Air Ministry for three months and at airfields before the Royal Air Force confirmed her as a forecaster. She worked as an officer-weather forecaster for WAAF until 1946, lecturing and briefing aircrews.

== Post war career ==
Following the war, Holford worked in London for Outdoor Publicity, the London Press Exchange's department of outdoor advertising from 1946 to 1948.

Holford was a fellow of the Royal Meteorological Society for nearly five decades. She was a council member of the society for three years.

Holford worked as a freelance journalist and writer, writing articles about the weather for various publications, including Amateur Gardening, Yachting Monthly, and Practical Boat Owner. In the 1970s, she started writing weather-related books, beginning with Interpreting the Weather in 1973. She also wrote the books British Weather Disasters and The Guinness Book of Weather Facts and Feats and weather guides for yachtsmen and pilots, such as The Yachtsman's Weather Guide. She gave talks on BBC Radio and worked for Southern Television as a standby forecaster from 1978 to 1981.

After moving to New Forest in 1978, Holford gave seminars for yachting instructors and self-published the booklet Looking at Weather in 1985. In 1991, she published an article in the Royal Meteorological Society's journal Weather describing her early career.

== Personal life ==
Holford married yachtsman Garth Holford in 1948. They had two children and moved to Brockenhurst in 1978. They moved to Thames Ditton in 2002 before Garth's death in 2004. Holford herself died in 2012.

== Selected publications ==
- Interpreting the Weather (1973) ISBN 0-7153-5800-6
- British Weather Disasters (1976) ISBN 0-7153-7276-9
- The Guinness Book of Weather Facts and Feats (1977) ISBN 0-900424-75-3
- The Yachtsman's Weather Guide (1979) ISBN 0-7063-5845-7
- The Air Pilot's Weather Guide (1988) ISBN 1-85310-025-0
