= John Goodman (Jesuit) =

Welsh Roman Catholic priest and martyr (1590–1642)

- Born: 1590; Bangor, Gwynedd, Wales
- Died: 1642 (aged 51–52); Newgate Prison, London, England
- Occupations: secular priest, Jesuit novice
- Criminal charges: Being a Jesuit in England
- Criminal penalty: Death
- Criminal status: Died in prison

John Goodman (1590–1642) was a Welsh Jesuit novice and secular priest active in England. He was born in Denbighshire and graduated from St John's College, Cambridge, being ordained in the Church of England in 1618. He became a Catholic convert and seminary priest in France, around 1621, before returning to England on mission.

Goodman was jailed and sentenced to death under an Elizabethan penal law which made it illegal for Jesuits to be in England. He was granted a reprieve by Charles I but was questioned by the Long Parliament. Charles I did not interfere and Parliament was content to let Goodman die in prison in 1642.

John Goodman was declared venerable by Pope Leo XIII in 1886.
