= William Filby (Roman Catholic priest) =

English Roman Catholic priest and martyr

Blessed William Filby
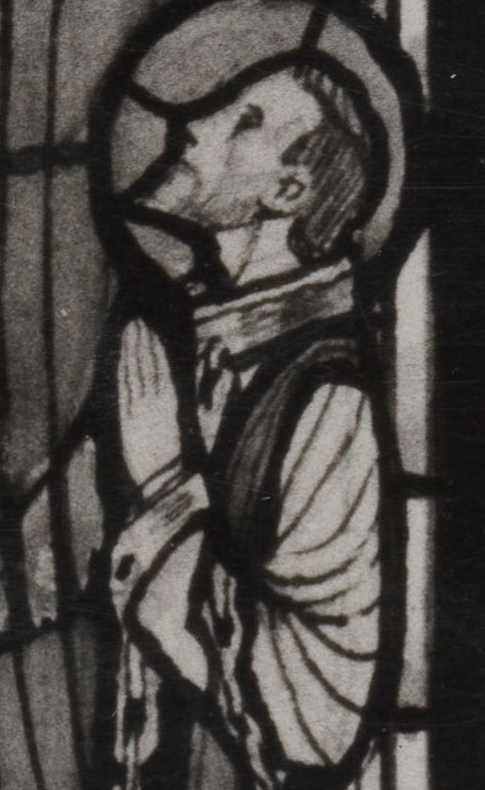
- Detail of a sketch of a stained glass window for Notre Dame Convent, Wigan, England
- Born: c. 1557 - 1560; Oxfordshire, England
- Died: 30 May 1582 (aged 21/22 - 24/25); Tyburn, London, England
- Beatified: 29 December 1886 by Pope Leo XIII
- Feast: May 30

William Filby (born c. 1557/1560 - 30 May 1582) was an English Roman Catholic priest. He was beatified in 1886.

== Life ==
Filby was born in Oxfordshire, England between 1557 and 1560. Educated at Lincoln College, Oxford, he was admitted to the seminary at Reims on 12 October 1579. He was ordained priest at Reims on 25 March 1581, and shortly after left for the English mission.

He was arrested in July, along with Edmund Campion at Lyford Grange, the house of a certain Francis Yate, then in Berkshire, and committed to the Tower of London, removed 14 August to the Marshalsea, and thence back to the Tower again. These arrests followed upon the Second Desmond Rebellion in Ireland and an uprising in Leinster. Filby was asked his opinion of Nicholas Sanders' landing with Spanish troops in County Kerry the previous September. Filby answered that as he did not know Sanders or his doings he had no opinion. He was sentenced 17 November, and from that date till he died was loaded with manacles. He was also deprived of his bedding for two months.

Filby was executed at Tyburn on 30 May 1582. With him died Thomas Cottam, Luke Kirby, and Laurence Richardson.
