= William Freeman (martyr) =

Beatified English priest

Blessed William Freeman
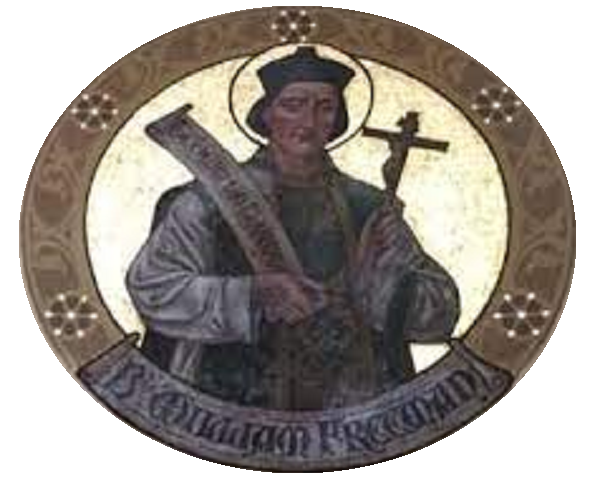

Martyr
- Born: c. 1558; Manthorp, near York
- Died: 13 August 1595 (aged 36 – 37); Warwick, Warwickshire, England
- Beatified: 15 December 1929 by Pope Pius XI
- Feast: 13 August
- Attributes: Scroll, crucifix, black biretta

William Freeman (c. 1558 – 13 August 1595) was an English Roman Catholic priest during the Reformation. He was convicted of treason and hanged, drawn and quartered at Warwick. He is one of 136 Catholic martyrs who were beatified by Pius XI in 1929.

== Life ==
The 1913 Catholic Encyclopedia states:

[He was born] near York. His parents were recusant Catholic, but he was conforming Anglican for some time. He was educated at Magdalen College, Oxford, and took his degree as BA in 1581. He then lived for some years in London. He witnessed the execution of Edward Stransham in 1586. Strongly impressed with this example, he left England and was ordained priest in 1587 at Reims. Returning to England in 1589, he worked for six years on the borders of Warwickshire. In January 1595, a special commission was sent down to Stratford-on-Avon to search the house of Mrs Heaths who had engaged his services as tutor to her son. William Freeman was arrested, and spent seven months in prison. He denied his priesthood, but also refused all offers to escape. Owing to the treachery of a fellow-prisoner, William Gregory, he was at last sentenced as a seminary priest and in spite of a protest of loyalty, suffered the death of a traitor at Warwick.
