= John Lockwood (priest) =

English Roman Catholic priest

Blessed John Lockwood

Martyr
- Born: c. 1555
- Died: 13 April 1642 (aged 86 - 87); York, England
- Venerated in: Roman Catholic Church
- Beatified: 15 December 1929 by Pope Pius XI
- Feast: 13 April

John Lockwood (born about 1555; executed at York, 13 April 1642) was an English Roman Catholic priest. He is a Catholic martyr, beatified in 1929.

== Life ==
He was the eldest son of Christopher Lockwood, of Sowerby, Yorkshire, by Clare, eldest daughter of Christopher Lascelles, of Sowerby and Brackenborough Castle, Yorkshire. With the second son, Francis, he arrived at Reims on 4 November 1579 and was sent to Douai College to study philosophy. It is also recorded that before going to the seminary his father had offered him a large sum of money to choose another way of life.

Francis was ordained in 1587, but John entered the English College, Rome, on 4 October 1595, and was ordained priest on 26 January 1597. He was sent on the English mission, on 20 April 1598. He worked in the area of Sowerby disguised as a gardener.

After suffering imprisonment he was banished in 1610, but returned to work until he was finally captured again 32 years later in 1642 and arrested at Wood End, Gatenby, the residence of Bridget Gatenby. Now 87 years of age, he was hanged, drawn, and quartered at York with Blessed Edmund Catherick.

== See also ==
- Catholic Church in the United Kingdom
- Douai Martyrs
