= Thomas Holford =

English Protestant schoolteacher (1541–1588)

Blessed Thomas Holford
- Born: c. 1541; Nantwich, Cheshire
- Died: 28 August 1588 (aged 46 - 47); Clerkenwell, England
- Venerated in: Roman Catholic Church
- Beatified: 15 December 1929 by Pope Pius XI
- Feast: 28 August

Thomas Holford (sometimes called Thomas Acton) (1541–1588) was an English Protestant schoolteacher who became a Catholic priest during the reign of Queen Elizabeth I. He was martyred at Clerkenwell in London, and is recognised by the Catholic Church as having the status of Blessed.

== Early life ==
Thomas Holford, the son of a minister, was born in 1541 near Nantwich, Cheshire, at Aston in the parish of Acton. He was raised as a Protestant and became a schoolteacher. He moved to Herefordshire to become resident tutor to the children of Sir James Scudamore of Holme Lacy. There, through the ministry of a Catholic priest, Richard Davis, around 1579 he became a Catholic himself. On 18 August 1582, Holford entered the English College at Rheims, where he trained to become a Catholic priest. He was ordained at Laon 9 April 1583 and was sent to England on 4 May the same year.

== Priesthood ==
Holford, and his mentor Richard Davis, narrowly avoided capture when staying with the Bellamys of Uxenden Hall near Harrow-on-the-Hill, Middlesex. The Bellamy house was raided on 2 November 1584. Holford returned to his native Cheshire, but was arrested at Nantwich in May 1585. A letter survives, sent by Holford from prison to his brother, in which he asks for some of his clothing to be sent so he can have it sold for funds. In it, he signs his name as Tho: Holforde.

In captivity, Holford was interrogated by the Anglican Bishop of Chester. The bishop left a description of Thomas as a tall, black (haired), fat, strong man, the crown of his head bald, his beard marquessated (shaven except for a moustache). Holford refused to accept exile, stating instead his expectation that he would be executed at Tyburn or Boughton. He was sent back to London for trial, but escaped by feigning insanity when his guards were suffering from a hangover.

In 1586, Holford again narrowly escaped capture at the Bellamy house when Sir Francis Walsingham raided London Catholic houses following an unsuccessful Catholic plot to replace Elizabeth I with Mary, Queen of Scots. Holford, using the alias Acton, then stayed away from London for some time but returned in 1588 to buy clothes. He was spotted after celebrating a clandestine Mass in Holborn, at the home of Swithin Wells. He was followed to the tailors, and arrested.

== Martyrdom and liturgical cult ==
Thomas Holford was held in custody at Newgate, where he was condemned on 26 August 1588. He was hanged (though not drawn and quartered) on 28 August 1588, at Clerkenwell. The executions which took place on this day and shortly thereafter were not all at the usual sites for executions in London, but were spread across the city to make an example of those condemned for their treasonous acts. This has been interpreted as a gesture of reprisal following the defeat of the Spanish Armada.

In the 2004 edition of the Roman Martyrology, Holford is listed as one of a group of eight martyrs who died in London on 28 August 1588. Following the Roman custom of naming a principal martyr 'and companions', the principal martyr is one William Dean, a priest. Three other priests are named besides Holford: William Gunter, Robert Morton and James Claxton. The group is completed by Thomas Felton, a Franciscan cleric, and the laymen Henry Webley and Hugh More.

Blessed Thomas is the eponymous patron of Blessed Thomas Holford Catholic College in Altrincham. There is a panel picture of him in St Joseph’s Church, Sale.
