= Halford Island =

Island in Nunavut, Canada

- Location within Nunavut Location within Canada

Geography
- Location: Frobisher Bay
- Coordinates: 62°15′N 66°05′W
- Archipelago: Arctic Archipelago

Administration
- Canada
- Nunavut: Nunavut
- Region: Qikiqtaaluk

Demographics
- Population: Uninhabited

Halford Island is an uninhabited Baffin Island offshore island located in the Arctic Archipelago in the territory of Nunavut. The island lies in Frobisher Bay, south of Buerger Point.
