= Halford Boudewyn =

Singaporean police officer and spy (1921–1998)

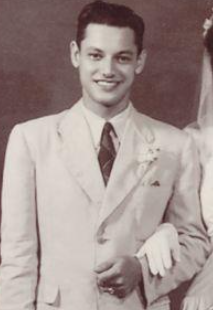
- Boudewyn in 1946 at his wedding
- Born: 1921; Singapore, Straits Settlements
- Died: 26 April 1998 (aged 77); Singapore
- Education: St. Joseph's Institution
- Occupations: Police officer; spy
- Known for: Smuggling documents from Japanese prisoner-of-war camps and spreading news using an illegal wireless set
- Awards: Colonial Police Medal, 1948; Pingat Bakti Setia, 1968

Halford Lovell Boudewyn (1921 – 26 April 1998) was a Singaporean retired police officer who, during the Japanese occupation, worked as a spy by stealing classified document from the Indian National Army (INA) and shared war news about the Japanese to prisoner-of-war camps using an illegal wireless set.

== Early life ==
Born in 1921, Boudewyn studied at St. Joseph's Institution and joined the Straits Settlements Police Force in September 1939 after his graduation. He was promoted to inspectorate in January 1941 and was later sent to work at Alor Gajah Police Station in Malacca, Malaysia. However, he returned to Singapore in February 1942 when the Japanese invaded Singapore and Malaya, causing the Straits Settlements Police Force to close.

== Work as a spy ==
In 1943, Boudewyn worked for a Eurasian food contractor who was supplying food to camps for the Indian National Army (INA) in Singapore. While supplying food, he became friends with a British Indian Army officer, Aubrey Wyman, who was a prisoner-of-war (POW). Wyman had a position at an office, opposite of the INA headquarters at Upper Serangoon Road, and had access to important documents which told of the harsh treatment of the POWs and the INA. Afterwards, Boudewyn and Wyman planned to smuggle the documents out.

By then, the documents were located in a different camp and Boudewyn quit his job to join the then-Japanese controlled police force. Boudewyn then posed as a vegetable seller who sold his vegetables to the camp everyday, a friend (not Wyman) would then buy the vegetables and hide the documents in the pile, returning the vegetables to Boudewyn as they were "rotten". He would tie the vegetables with the documents on his bicycle, which would avoid detection from the officers as they searched him before he entered or left.

Along with this, while working at the Japanese controlled police force, he commandeered wireless sets. He stole two and replaced them with "duds". He hid one in a laundry basket at Orchard Road Police Station and the other at a house in Chancery Lane. He monitored the broadcasts and with the help of Wyman, relayed the information to POW camps.

He wrote what he heard from the radio on paper before transferring the notes to jelly. The jelly absorbed the ink from the carbon pencil and functioned as a printing block. He then used this to create about 100 copies and, using sago paste, would paste them on lampposts from St Barnabas Road to Tanjong Pagar Railway Station. Boudewyn was later rewarded $50 by the Japanese for having "discovered" these postings.

After being given a tip however, Boudewyn got scared and buried the Chancery Lane wireless set and the documents in an oil drum at the Chancery Lane house but continued to use the Orchard Road wireless set. Unexpectedly, the Japanese decided to occupy the house, turning the spot where Boudewyn had buried the oil drum into a garden. The Japanese had dug about 3 feet into the ground, one foot away from where he had buried the oil drum.

He later moved the oil drum over to his brother's house, which is where it remained until after the war. Afterwards, Boudewyn contacted the Army Intelligence and submitted the documents to them. These documents were later used as evidence in an inquiry used to investigate high-ranking officers.

== Post-war and life ==
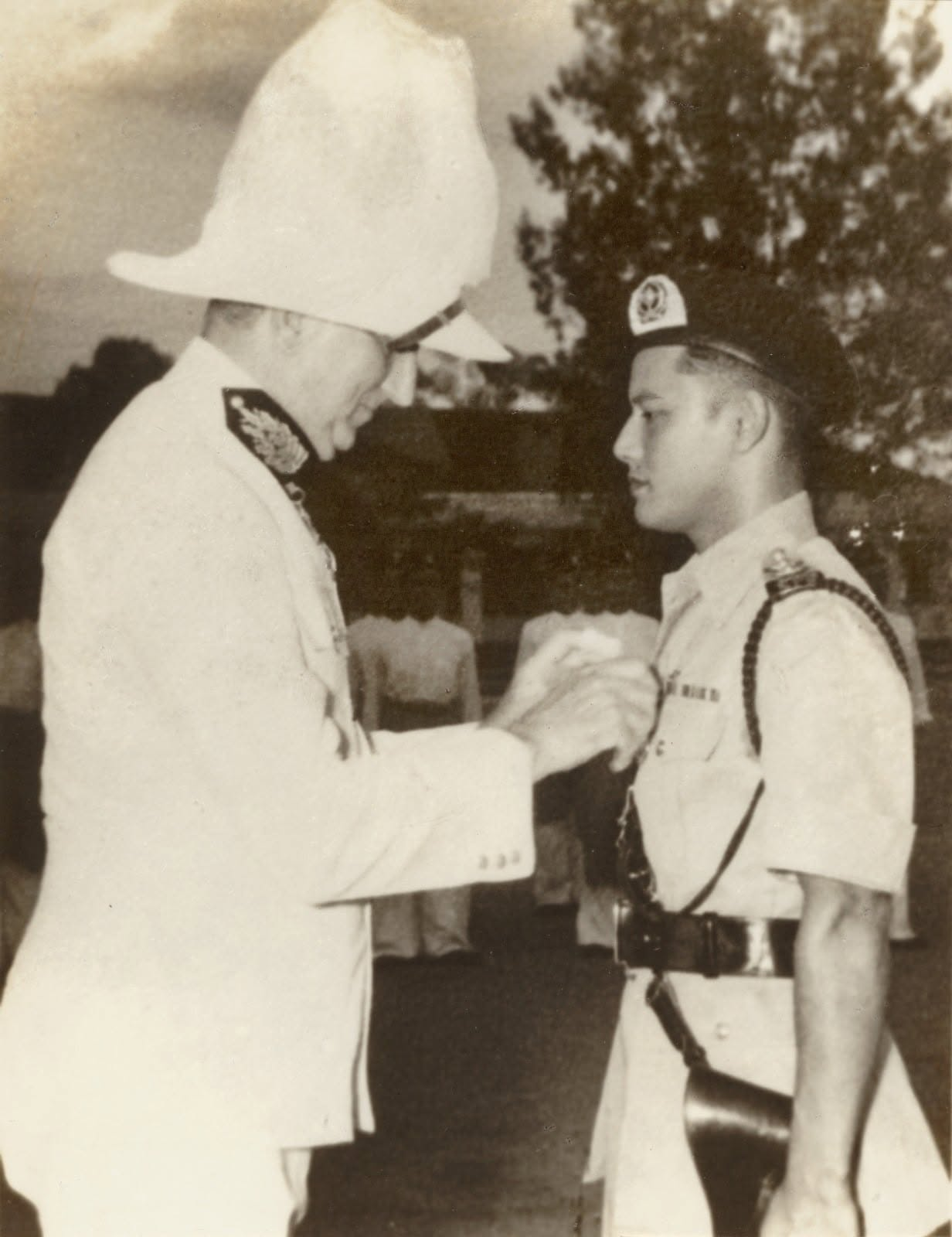
Boudewyn (right) being awarded the Colonial Police Medal by Franklin Charles Gimson.

In 1948, Boudewyn was awarded the Colonial Police Medal by Governor of Singapore Franklin Charles Gimson. In 1968, he was awarded the Pingat Bakti Setia (Long Service Award). In 1971, he retired from the Police Force due to health complications.

In 1992, he lived at Toa Payoh. In 1946, he married Theresa Mildred Boudewyn (née Da Silva), a cosmetics saleswoman. In 1985, he suffered from a stroke after having undergone five coronary bypass operations. On 26 April 1998, Boudewyn died in his sleep at 77 after suffering from bladder cancer for 12 years and severe heart complications. He was survived by his wife, two daughters, and one son.
