= Lawrence Richardson (martyr) =

English Roman Catholic priest and martyr

Blessed Lawrence Richardson
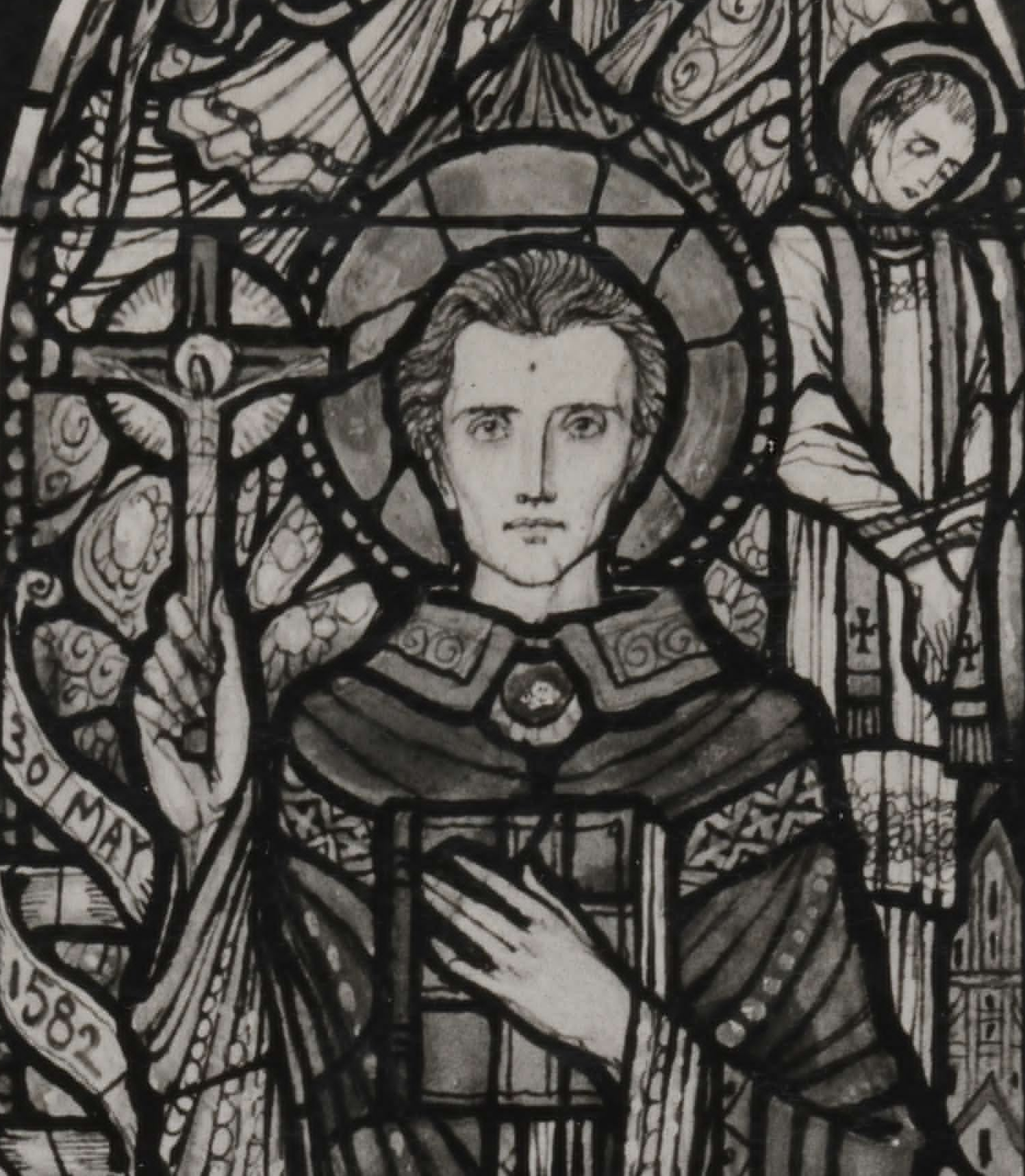
- Detail of a sketch of a stained glass window for Notre Dame Convent, Wigan, England

Priest and Martyr
- Born: Great Crosby, Lancashire, England
- Died: 30 May 1582; Tyburn, London, England
- Beatified: 29 December 1886 by Pope Leo XIII
- Feast: 30 May
- Attributes: Crucifix, bible, noose in neck

Lawrence Richardson of Great Crosby, Lancashire, was an English martyr.

Born Lawrence Johnson, he was the son of Richard Johnson, of Great Crosby, Lancashire, and a Fellow of Brasenose College. He was ordained priest at Douai in March 1577, and afterwards, taking the name of Richardson, left for the English Mission, in late July. He worked in his native Lancashire.

In 1581, Richardson was arrested in London on his way to France and imprisoned in Newgate, charged with complicity in the pretended "Rheims and Rome plot". He was executed at Tyburn in 1582, with Luke Kirby. His feast day is May 30. He was beatified in 1886.

== See also ==
- Douai Martyrs
