= Alexander Briant =

English Roman Catholic saint

Saint Alexander Briant S.J.
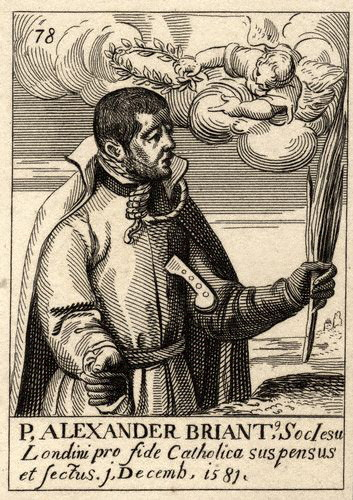

Priest and Martyr
- Born: 17 August 1556; Somerset, England
- Died: 1 December 1581 (aged 25); Tyburn, London, England
- Venerated in: Roman Catholic Church
- Beatified: 29 December 1886 by Pope Leo XIII
- Canonized: 25 October 1970 by Pope Paul VI
- Feast: 1 December (individual); 25 October (along with Forty Martyrs of England and Wales); 29 October (one of the Douai Martyrs)
- Attributes: noose in neck, knife in chest, martyr's palm, crown of martyrdom, crucifix

Alexander Briant, SJ (17 August 1556 – 1 December 1581) was an English Jesuit and martyr, executed at Tyburn.

== Life ==
He was born in Somerset, and entered Hart Hall, Oxford (now Hertford College), at an early age. While there, he became a pupil of Robert Parsons, and he completed his studies with him at Balliol College, which, along with his association with Richard Holtby, led to his conversion. After leaving university, he entered the English College at Rheims then went to the English College, Douai, and was ordained priest on 29 March 1578. Assigned to the English mission in August of the following year, he laboured with zeal in his own county of Somerset.

A party of the persecution, searching for Parsons, placed Alexander Briant under arrest on 28 April 1581. Arrested along with Briant was Gilbert Bodey, brother of John Bodey. Gilbert Bodey was scourged at Bridewell and afterwards confined to Counter Prison. He was released on bond, and when not called to appear, escaped to Rheims.

== Trial and Execution ==
In the hope of extorting information, Briant was sent to the Counter. After fruitless attempts to this end, he was taken to the Tower of London where he was subjected to torture. It was during this confinement that Briant penned his letter to the Jesuit Fathers in England requesting admission into the Society, which was granted. He was arraigned with six other priests on 16 November 1581, in Queen's Bench, Westminster, on the charge of high treason, and condemned to death. In his letter to the Jesuit Fathers, he says that he felt no pain during the various tortures he underwent, and adds: "Whether this that I say be miraculous or no, God knoweth." He was twenty-five years old when he was executed by being hanged, drawn and quartered on 1 December 1581. Through either malice or carelessness of the executioner, he was put to needless suffering. Edmund Campion and Ralph Sherwin were also executed with him.

== Veneration and relic ==
Alexander Briant was beatified on 29 December 1886 by Pope Leo XIII. Alexander Briant was canonized in 1970 by Pope Paul VI as one of the Forty Martyrs of England and Wales with a common feast day of 25 October. His individual feast day is celebrated on 1 December, the day of his martyrdom.

A relic, a corporal, which is housed in the English College in Rome, has the names of five priests. Briant is one of those names stitched in the cloth.

In 2023, a pastoral area of the Roman Catholic Diocese of Clifton was named in honour of Briant.
