= Thomas Ford (martyr) =

English Roman Catholic priest and martyr

Blessed Thomas Ford
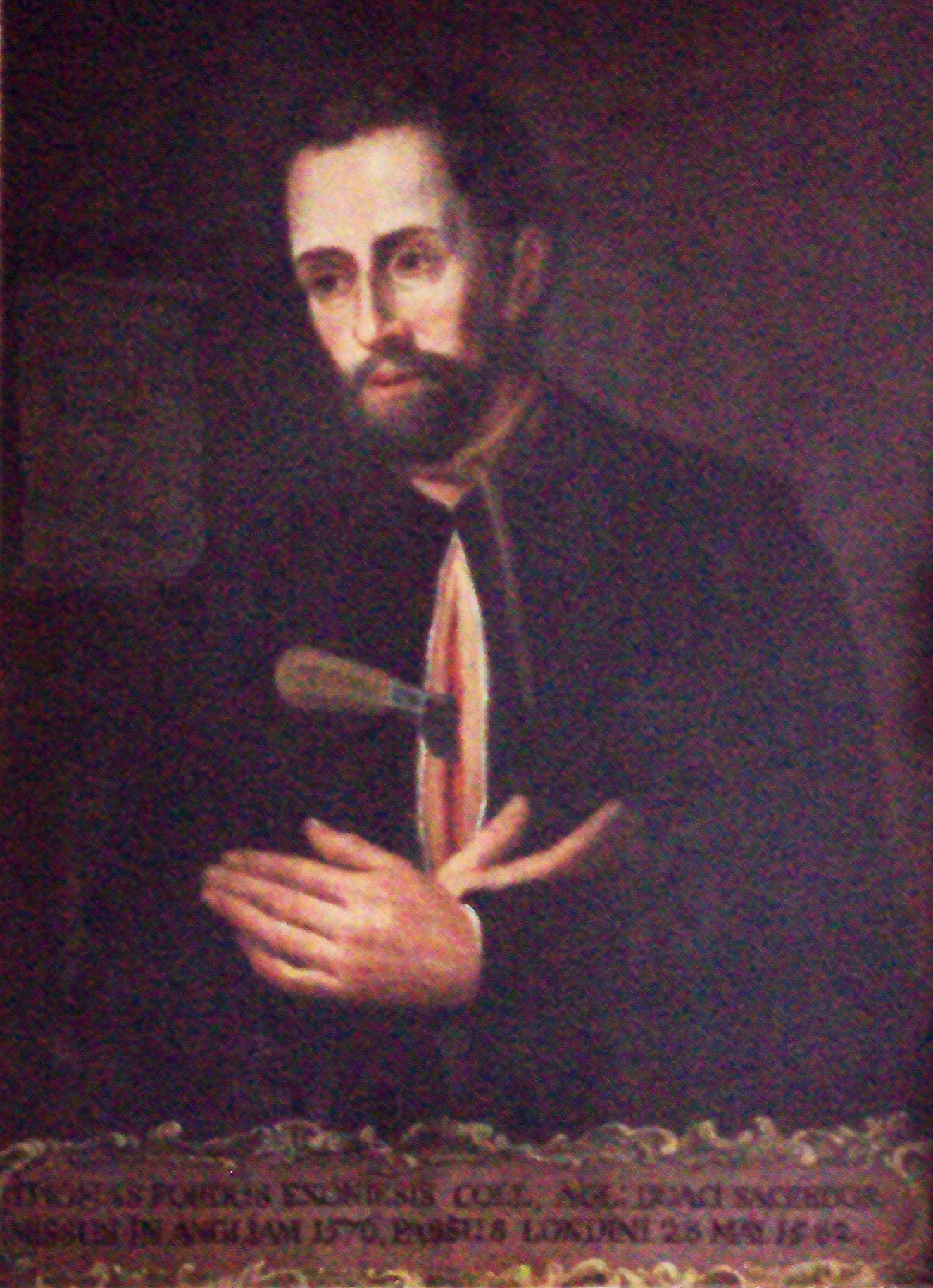
- Portrait in The English Convent in Bruges

Priest and Martyr
- Born: Devonshire, South West England
- Died: 28 May 1582; Tyburn, London, England
- Venerated in: Roman Catholic Church
- Beatified: 29 December 1886 by Pope Leo XIII
- Feast: 28 May

Thomas Ford (died 28 May 1582), a Devonshire native, was a Catholic martyr executed during the reign of Elizabeth I.

== Life ==
He received a Masters of Arts at Trinity College, Oxford, on 24 July 1567, and became a fellow (although one source says president) there. In 1570, he left for the English College, Douai, and was one of its first three students to be ordained, receiving his orders March 1573 in Brussels.

Soon after receiving his Bachelor of Divinity in Douai, on 2 May 1576, he left for England. There he settled in Berkshire, becoming the chaplain of James Braybrooke at Sutton Courtenay, and then of Francis Yate and the Bridgettine nuns who were staying with Yate at Lyford Grange. On 17 July 1581, he was arrested by the government spy, George Eliot, along with Edmund Campion. On 22 July of that same year, he was put in the Tower, where he was tortured.

Ford was taken to court along with John Shert on 16 November with a faked charge of conspiracy. It is said he had conspired in places he had never been (Rome and Rheims), on days he had been in England. Both he and Shert were condemned on 21 November and, along with Robert Johnson, beheaded in May 1582. All three were beatified in 1886.
