= Edward Stransham =

English Roman Catholic priest and martyr

Edward Stransham (c. 1557, Oxford – executed 21 January 1586, Tyburn) was an English Roman Catholic priest. He is a Catholic martyr, beatified in 1929.

== Life ==
Stransham was born at Oxford, near the Bocardo Gate, around 1557. He was educated at St John's College, Oxford, becoming B.A. in 1575-6. He arrived at Douai College in 1577, and went with the college to Reims in 1578, but returned to England due to illness. Stransham is described as tall and dark, slightly bearded, and very emaciated.

In 1579, however, he returned to Reims with four potential students, and was ordained priest at Soissons in December 1580. Although ill he left for England 30 June 1581, as it was thought his native air might do him good. With him went fellow priest Nicholas Woodfen, of the London Diocese, ordained priest at Reims, 25 March 1581. Leaving from Dieppe, they landed at Newhaven. Stransham worked mainly around Oxford.

In 1583 Stransham came back to Reims with ten Oxford converts. After five months there he went to Paris, where he remained about eighteen months at death's door from consumption. In June 1585 he took a Dieppe fishing boat and was put ashore on the Sussex coast. He then made his way to London on foot.

He was arrested in Bishopsgate Street Without, London, 17 July 1585, while saying Mass, and was condemned at the next assizes for being a priest. He was hanged, drawn and quartered at Tyburn.

His beatification took place in 1929, under Pope Pius XI.

== Roman Martyrology ==
"In London, in 1586, the blessed martyrs Edward Stransham and Nicholas Wheeler, priests, condemned to death under Queen Elizabeth I because of their priesthood and taken to the gallows at Tyburn."

== See also ==
- Catholic Church in the United Kingdom
- Douai Martyrs
- William Freeman (martyr)
