= Blessed Thomas Holford Catholic College =

Coordinates: 53.3877°N 2.3413°W

Location
- Urban Road; Altrincham, Greater Manchester, WA15 8HT; England

Information
- Type: Voluntary aided
- Motto: Inspiring People, Changing Lives
- Religious affiliation: Roman Catholic
- Local authority: Trafford
- Department for Education URN: 106376 Tables
- Ofsted: Reports
- Head teacher: Clare Hogg
- Gender: Mixed
- Age: 11 to 18
- Enrolment: 1499
- Capacity: 1555
- Houses: 6 (Newan, Sienna, Stien, Romero, Bosco, Teresa)
- Website: www.bthcc.org.uk

Blessed Thomas Holford Catholic College is a secondary school based in Altrincham, Greater Manchester. The school specialises in maths and computing, and is named after Blessed Thomas Holford, a 16th-century priest from Cheshire. The college has a Catholic identity.

== Curriculum ==
The college puts emphasis on maths and computing, and follows the Key Stage process. At Key Stage 3 in year 7 & 8, the pupils take the following subjects:

- English (3 hours)
- Maths (4 hours)
- Science (3 hours)
- Religious Education (2.5 hours)
- Design Technology (3 hours) - Woodwork, food technology, graphic design, art, music, PSHCE
- Computer Science (1 hour)
- French/Spanish (2 hours)
- History (2 hours)
- Geography (2 hours)
- Physical Education (2 hours)
- Drama (1 hour)

For GCSE, the pupils take core subjects including English language, English literature, Science, Mathematics, RE, computer science or BTEC and PE although not to complete as a GCSE. Pupils choose from a variety of additional subjects, including history, geography, art, health and social care, physical education, food technology, business studies, classics, music, Italian, drama, French, German, Japanese, Spanish. BTEC courses for sport are also available. Pupils have to take at least one, but not more than three, of History, Geography, Spanish and French. Out of all the other subjects a maximum of two can be chosen.

== Academic performance and Ofsted judgements ==
It was judged Outstanding by Ofsted in 2012 and 2009. In 2022 its inspection rating was 'Requires Improvement'.

== Football Academy ==
The school has a UEFA-standard FieldTurf artificial grass football pitch which was opened in April 2007 by Bobby Charlton. The pitch, which cost £1 million to install, was used by the England national football team for training prior to an away game against Russia at the Luzhniki Stadium in Moscow, as it uses the same surface as the Russian pitch.
