= John Hambley (martyr) =

Cornish Catholic martyr

John Hambley (died 1587) was an English Catholic and martyr, who died during the reign of Elizabeth I.

== Life ==
John Hambley was a native of the parish of St. Mabyn, near Bodmin, Cornwall. Hambley was converted to Catholicism by reading one of Robert Persons' books in 1582. Around Christmas that year he ceased to attend the worship established by law, and fearing the penalty entailed by absence from church decided to leave the county where he was known. He journeyed to London, where he took up abode at the "Sun and Seven Stars" in Smithfield until May 1583. During that time he was reconciled to the Catholic faith in a chamber over the gate at the "Red Lion" in Holborn by Mr. Fortescue, a seminary priest staying there.

In early May 1583 he sailed from Rye in Sussex for Dieppe, arriving at Rheims by way of Rouen by the end of the month. He studied at Rheims and was ordained a priest 22 September 1584. Disguised as a serving man he left with Maurice Williams for the English Mission on 6 April 1585. Landing near Ipswich, they made his way to London taking up residence in the "Blue Boar". A fortnight later Hambley relocated to the "Red Lion", placing himself under the direction of the Catholic priest John Cornelius. During this time, he ministered to some of the clandestine Catholics at the Inns of Court. After about five weeks he then went to Dorsetshire and worked in the Western Counties for about a year.

Around Easter 1586, he was denounced by a gentleman's servant who had once been his fellow-lodger. He was captured, then tried and condemned at Taunton; however, he denied his faith for a reprieve and then broke prison. Having fled to Salisbury, he continued his labours there until the next August. Then, on the eve of the Assumption, the Protestant Bishop of Salisbury decided to search the houses of local Catholics, suspecting that he might catch a priest saying mass. During the raids Hambley was recaptured. Now worse off than ever, he became even more afraid than before and gave up the names of most of his Catholic friends, as well as denied his faith. However, the judges did not trust his statements and he was held over for the next assizes. Then, on the next Easter, he was tried again. This third time though, he did not break, and was executed near Salisbury, "standing to it manfully, and inveighing much against his former fault".

No one is sure what caused him to stand firm during his final arrest. One contemporary, Father Warford, believed it was due to his guardian angel, but another, Father Gerard, with great probability, states that his strength came from a fellow prisoner, Thomas Pilchard, who later became a martyr himself.

== See also ==
- Catholic Church in the United Kingdom
- Douai Martyrs
