= Margaret Holford (the elder) =

English novelist, playwright and poet (1757–1834)

Margaret Holford (1757–1834, sometimes known as "the elder") was an English novelist, playwright, and poet of the late 18th century. Both she and her daughter, likewise Margaret Holford, were accomplished authors.

== Life and family ==
Born Margaret Wrench in Chester in 1757, she married Allen Holford of nearby Davenham. She died in Chester in November 1834.

Holford's daughter, likewise Margaret Holford (1778–1852), was also an accomplished author. Their works are said to be "often confused in catalogues and dictionary entries."

== Works ==
- Fanny: A Novel: In a Series of Letters, 1785 (anonymously)
- Gresford Vale; and Other Poems, 1798
- "The Way to Win Her" (five-act play), in The New British Theatre, 1814
