= James Thompson (martyr) =

English Roman Catholic priest and martyr

Blessed James Thompson
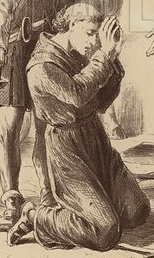
- Illustration for Memoirs of Missionary Priests by Bishop Challoner (Jack, 1878)
- Born: Yorkshire, England
- Died: 28 November 1582; Knavesmire, North Yorkshire, England
- Honored in: Roman Catholicism
- Beatified: 29 December 1886 by Pope Leo XIII
- Feast: 28 November

James Thompson, also known as James Hudson, was a Catholic priest and martyr of York, hanged during the reign of Elizabeth I.

== Life ==
A native of Yorkshire, Thompson arrived at the college at Reims 19 September 1580, and in May of the next year, by virtue of a dispensation, was admitted at Soissons, with one Nicholas Fox, to all Sacred orders within twelve days, although at the time he was so ill that he could hardly stand.

He was sent on his mission that August, and was arrested in York a year later, on 11 August 1582. When he was taken before the Council of the North, he openly confessed to his being a priest. This was received with some surprise as he had been for some years well known in the city. Thompson explained that his time abroad had been relatively brief. He was shackled and imprisoned—first in a private jail, until his money ran out, and then in York Castle.

He was condemned on 25 November 1582 and was hanged at the Knavesmire that December. He protested the entire time that he had never plotted against the queen, and that he died in and for Catholic faith. He refused to dispute with the Protestant minister in attendance. While he was hanging, he raised his hands to heaven, then beat his chest with his right hand, before he finally made the sign of cross and died. In spite of his sentence, he was neither disemboweled nor quartered, but was buried under the gallows.

== See also ==
- Catholic Church in the United Kingdom
- Douai Martyrs
