= Margaret Holford =

English poet and translator (1778–1852)

Margaret Holford (1778–1852) (also published as Margaret Hodson) was an English poet and translator. Her most successful work was a historical verse romance, Wallace, or, The Fight of Falkirk (1809).

== Life ==
Her mother, also Margaret Holford (1757–1834) was likewise an author, and their works have sometimes been confused in bibliographies. Her father, Allen Holford, died when Margaret Holford the younger was a child. She was the eldest of her parents' four daughters and educated herself through reading at home. Years later, she travelled to France and claimed that she was able to communicate with any of the locals whom she spoke there.

Holford was baptised on 1 June 1778 in Chester and on 16 October 1826 married Septimus Hodson (1768–1833), chaplain in ordinary to the Prince of Wales, who was then Anglican rector of Thrapston, Northamptonshire. She was his third wife. The marriage took place in South Kirkby, Yorkshire and they lived in Sharow Lodge, Ripon. Her later work was published under her married name, Margaret Hodson.

Her husband died in 1833. After her husband's death, she stayed with a Mrs. Lawrence, a woman who owned the estate of Studley Park in Ripon. By 1835 Holford had bought a cottage in Plantation Terrace, Dawlish on the Devon Coast and remained there until she died at home on 11 September 1852.

== Career ==
The first published work of Margaret Holford the younger is thought to have been the two-volume Calaf, a Persian Tale, written when she was 17 and published anonymously about 1798. Her most successful was a historical verse romance entitled Wallace, or, The Fight of Falkirk. Also published anonymously, it appeared in 1809, a year after Walter Scott's Marmion, which it is said to have "blatantly imitated". Around the same time she wrote Lines Occasioned by Reading the Poetical Works of Walter Scott and sent it to him, but he did not acknowledge receipt of it, despite intervention by their mutual friend, Joanna Baillie.

The publication of Holford's novel First Impressions in 1800 compelled Jane Austen to change the title of her own novel to Pride and Prejudice.

Her later romantic poems included Poems (1811), Margaret of Anjou (1816) and The Past (1819) were not a critical success. She also wrote a three-volume novel, Warbeck of Wolfstein (published 1820), other poems, and a play that was never published or performed. She published a translation Italian Stories in 1823.

Following her marriage in 1826 she only published a translation from Spanish entitled The Lives of Vasco Nunez de Balboa and Francisco Pizarro (1832), dedicated to Robert Southey.

She had a wide circle of literary acquaintances and correspondents that included correspondence with Walter Scott in 1825, Samuel Coleridge, William Wordsworth, William Sotheby, and Walter Savage Landor, who in 1845 encouraged her to reissue her successful novel Wallace. Joanna Baillie was a close associate. Robert Southey stayed for a week with the Hodsons in 1829.
