= John Sandys (priest) =

English Roman Catholic priest and martyr

John Sandys (1550 or 1555 in Lancashire – 11 August 1586 executed at Gloucester) was an English Roman Catholic priest. He is a Catholic martyr, beatified in 1987, and is commemorated on 11 August.

== Life ==
John Sandys was born in the Diocese of Chester, and studied at the University of Oxford, and Douai College.

He arrived at Reims 4 June 1583, and was ordained priest in the Holy Cross Chapel of Reims Cathedral by the Cardinal Archbishop, Louis de Guise. He was sent on the English mission 2 October 1584.

He was executed at Gloucester in 1586. John Sandys was among the 85 martyrs of England and Wales beatified by Pope John Paul II on 22 November 1987.

== See also ==
- Catholic Church in the United Kingdom
- Douai Martyrs
