= Richard Thirkeld =

English Roman Catholic priest and martyr

Blessed Richard Thirkeld
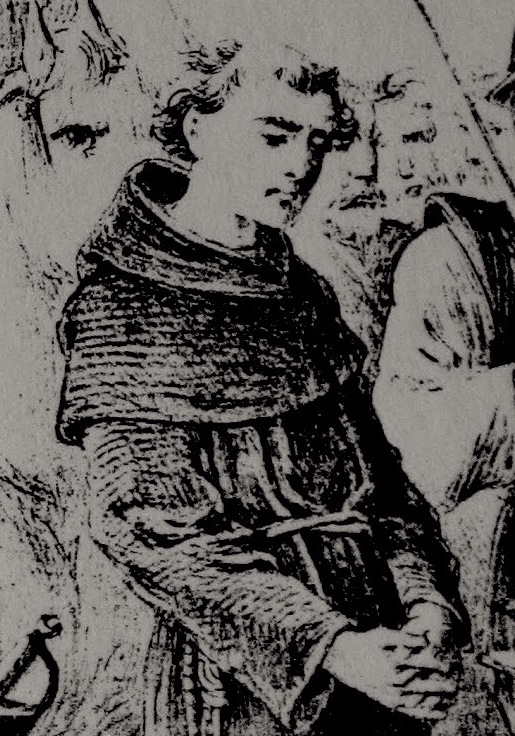
- Richard Thirkill, Guarded by the Sheriff and his men (Illustration for the Memoirs of Missionary Priests, 1878)

Martyr
- Born: Coniscliffe, Durham, England
- Died: 29 May 1583; York, England
- Beatified: 29 December 1886 by Pope Leo XIII
- Feast: 29 May

Richard Thirkeld (died 29 May 1583) was an English Roman Catholic priest. He is a Catholic martyr beatified by Pope Leo XIII in 1886.

== Life ==
Thirkeld was born at Coniscliffe, Durham, England. From Queen's College, Oxford, where he was in 1564–5, he went to Reims, where he was ordained priest, 18 April 1579.

He left 23 May for the English mission, where he ministered in or about York, and acted as confessor to Margaret Clitheroe. On the eve of the Annunciation, 1583, he was arrested while visiting one of the Catholic prisoners in the Kidcote on Ouse bridge. He at once confessed his priesthood, both to the pursuivants, who arrested him, and to the mayor before whom he was brought, and for the night was lodged in the house of the high sheriff. The next day his trial took place, at which he managed to appear in his cassock, which made him appear all the more venerable.

The charge was one of having reconciled the Queen's subjects to the Church of Rome. He was found guilty on 27 May and condemned 28 May. He was executed at York on 29 May 1583, secretly because authorities feared that his public execution would have caused a public demonstration.

Six of his letters survive, and were summarized by Bede Camm.

== See also ==
- Douai Martyrs
