= Anthony Middleton =

English Roman Catholic priest and martyr

Blessed Anthony Middleton

Martyr
- Born: Yorkshire, England
- Died: 6 May 1590; London
- Beatified: 15 December 1929 by Pope Pius XI
- Feast: 6 May

Anthony Middleton (died 1590) was an English Roman Catholic priest and martyr from Yorkshire. He trained at Douai College, and returned to England in 1586. He was captured by Richard Topcliffe in Fleet Street, London, close to where he was hanged, drawn and quartered with Edward Jones on 6 May 1590.

He was beatified on 15 December 1929 and his feast day is 6 May.

== See also ==
- Catholic Church in the United Kingdom
- Douai Martyrs
