= William Patenson =

English Roman Catholic priest and martyr

Blessed William Patenson
- Born: Durham, England
- Died: 1591–2; Tyburn, England
- Venerated in: Roman Catholic Church
- Beatified: 1929 by Pope Pius XI
- Feast: 22 January

William Patenson (born in Yorkshire or Durham; executed at Tyburn, 22 January 1591–2) was an English Roman Catholic priest and martyr. He was beatified in 1929.

He is commemorated on 22 January.

== Life ==
Admitted to the English College, Reims, 1 May 1584, he was ordained to the priesthood in September 1587, and left for the English mission 17 January 1588–9.

On the third Sunday of Advent, 1591, he said Mass in the house of Lawrence Mompesson at Clerkenwell, and while dining with another priest, James Young, the priest-catchers surprised them. Young found a hiding-place, but Patenson was arrested and condemned at the Old Bailey after Christmas.

According to Young, while in prison he converted and reconciled three or four thieves before their death. The night before his martyrdom, according to Richard Verstegan, Patenson converted six out of seven felons who occupied the condemned cell with him. Because he did this, he was cut down while still conscious and quartered alive.

== Sources ==
- John Hungerford Pollen, Acts of the English Martyrs (London, 1891), pp. 115–117
- John Hungerford Pollen, English Martyrs 1584–1603 (London, 1908), pp. 208, 292
- Richard Challoner, Memoirs of Missionary Priests, I, no. 94 (London, 1843), pp. 292–293
