= William Gunter (martyr) =

Welsh Roman Catholic priest and martyr

Blessed William Gunter

Priest and Martyr
- Born: Raglan, Monmouthshire, Wales
- Died: 28 August 1588; Shoreditch, London, England
- Venerated in: Roman Catholic Church
- Beatified: 15 December 1929 by Pope Pius XI

William Gunter (died 28 August 1588) was a Roman Catholic priest who was martyred under Queen Elizabeth I during the aftermath of the Spanish Armada, and is one of the One Hundred and Seven Martyrs of England and Wales.

He was beatified in 1929 by Pope Pius XI.

== History ==
William Gunter was from Raglan in Monmouthshire. He studied in Reims, France, where he was ordained in 1587.

He was martyred in Lincoln's Inn Fields on 28 August 1588 under the persecutions of Queen Elizabeth I.

== See also ==
- List of Catholic martyrs of the English Reformation
