= List of people executed by the Tudors =

People executed during the Tudor era in England

This is a list of prominent people executed by the state during the reign of the Tudors. The list is not exhaustive.

== In the reign of Henry VII (1485–1509) ==
Convict	Date of Execution	Details
William Catesby	25 August 1485	Chancellor of the Exchequer and Speaker of the House of Commons for King Richard III. Executed in Leicester after the Battle of Bosworth Field.
Humphrey Stafford	8 July 1486	Executed for leading the Stafford and Lovell rebellion.
Joan Boughton	28 April 1494	Burnt at the stake in Smithfield for adhering to John Wycliffe's Lollard theology.
Simon Mountford	c. 30 January 1495	Executed for supporting the rebellion of Perkin Warbeck.
William Stanley	16 February 1495	Beheaded for supporting the pretender Perkin Warbeck's rebellion.
Michael An Gof	27 June 1497	Executed for their roles in the Cornish rebellion.
Thomas Flamank	27 June 1497	Executed for their roles in the Cornish rebellion.
James Tuchet, 7th Baron Audley	28 June 1497	Beheaded for treason after being captured in the Battle of Deptford Bridge.
Ralph Wulford	12 February 1499	Executed as a pretender to the Earl of Warwick.
Perkin Warbeck	23 November 1499	Flemish impostor-pretender as the lost Richard of Shrewsbury, Duke of York. Captured in Hampshire after leading several rebellions and hanged in Tyburn.
Edward Plantagenet, 17th Earl of Warwick	28 November 1499	Claimant to the English throne as male heir to the House of York. Executed for treason at Tower Hill after allegedly plotting to escape prison with Perkin Warbeck.
James Tyrrell	6 May 1502	Executed for treason for supporting Yorkist claimant Edmund de la Pole.

== In the reign of Henry VIII (1509–1547) ==
Convict	Date of Execution	Details
Edmund Dudley	17 August 1510	Member of the Council Learned in the Law, Speaker of the House of Commons, and President of King's Council under Henry VII. Executed for constructive treason.
Sir Richard Empson	17 August 1510	Speaker of the House of Commons and knight of the shire for Northamptonshire in the English Parliament under Henry VII. Convicted by attainder for constructive treason.
Edmund de la Pole, 6th Earl of Suffolk	30 April 1513	Leading Yorkist claimant to the throne. Extradited to England by Philip the Handsome and executed for treason at Tower Hill.
Edward Stafford, 3rd Duke of Buckingham	17 May 1521	Member of the Henry VIII's Privy Council and descendant of the Plantagenet Dynasty. Executed for alleged treason at Tower Hill.
Rhys ap Gruffydd	4 December 1531	Arrested after threatening Lord Ferrers at knifepoint and accused of plotting to overthrow the English administration in Wales. Executed for treason at Tower Hill.
Elizabeth Barton	20 April 1534	Catholic nun executed after prophesying against Henry VIII's marriage to Anne Boleyn.
Edward Bocking	20 April 1534	Benedictine monk executed for supporting Barton.
Richard Risby	20 April 1534	Franciscan friar executed for treason.
John Houghton	4 May 1535	Carthusian hermits from the London Charterhouse executed for refusing to sign the Oath of Supremacy swearing allegiance to the King as the Supreme Governor of the Church of England and renouncing papal primacy before a royal commission under the Act of Supremacy. Some of the Forty Martyrs of England and Wales canonised by Pope Paul VI in 1970.
Robert Lawrence	4 May 1535	Carthusian hermits from the London Charterhouse executed for refusing to sign the Oath of Supremacy swearing allegiance to the King as the Supreme Governor of the Church of England and renouncing papal primacy before a royal commission under the Act of Supremacy. Some of the Forty Martyrs of England and Wales canonised by Pope Paul VI in 1970.
Augustine Webster	4 May 1535	Carthusian hermits from the London Charterhouse executed for refusing to sign the Oath of Supremacy swearing allegiance to the King as the Supreme Governor of the Church of England and renouncing papal primacy before a royal commission under the Act of Supremacy. Some of the Forty Martyrs of England and Wales canonised by Pope Paul VI in 1970.
Humphrey Middlemore	19 June 1535	Carthusian hermits from the London Charterhouse executed for refusing to sign the Oath of Supremacy before a royal commission under the Act of Supremacy.
William Exmew	19 June 1535	Carthusian hermits from the London Charterhouse executed for refusing to sign the Oath of Supremacy before a royal commission under the Act of Supremacy.
Sebastian Newdigate	19 June 1535	Carthusian hermits from the London Charterhouse executed for refusing to sign the Oath of Supremacy before a royal commission under the Act of Supremacy.
John Fisher	22 June 1535	Bishop of Rochester, former Chancellor of Cambridge University, and Cardinal-Priest of San Vitale. Hanged, drawn, and quartered for treason after refusing to accept Henry VIII as Supreme Governor of the Church of England under the First Succession Act and supporting his former wife Catherine of Aragon during their divorce. Canonized by Pope Pius XI in 1935.
Sir Thomas More	6 July 1535	Lord High Chancellor of England, author of Utopia, and opponent of the Protestant Reformation. Executed for refusing to take the Oath of Supremacy. Canonised by Pope Pius XI in 1935 and declared patron saint of statesmen and politicians by Pope John Paul II in 2000.
George Boleyn, Viscount Rochford	17 May 1536	Beheaded for false charges of high treason and incest with his sister Anne Boleyn.
Henry Norris	17 May 1536	Groom of the Stool. Beheaded for false charges of high treason and adultery with Boleyn.
William Brereton	17 May 1536	Groom of the Privy Chamber. Beheaded for false charges of high treason and adultery with Boleyn.
Mark Smeaton	17 May 1536	Court musician. Beheaded for false charges of high treason and adultery with Boleyn.
Francis Weston	17 May 1536	Gentleman of the Privy Chamber. Beheaded for false charges of high treason and adultery with Boleyn.
Anne Boleyn	19 May 1536	Former Queen consort of England. Beheaded at White Tower for false charges of adultery, incest, and high treason engineered by Thomas Cromwell after she was unable to bear King Henry VIII a male heir.
John Hussey, 1st Baron Hussey of Sleaford	early 1537	Chief Butler of England, member of the House of Lords, and chamberlain to Princess Mary. Executed for role in the Pilgrimage of Grace.
Thomas FitzGerald, 10th Earl of Kildare and his five uncles	3 February 1537	Executed under an act of attainder after leading a rebellion against English rule in Ireland.
John Rochester	11 May 1537	Publicly hanged in York for refusing to sign the Oath of Supremacy.
Sir Thomas Percy	2 June 1537	Hanged, drawn and quartered for treason at Tyburn after leading Bigod's rebellion.
Francis Bigod	2 June 1537	Leader of Bigod's rebellion.
Thomas Darcy, 1st Baron Darcy de Darcy	30 June 1537	Opponent of the dissolution of the monasteries. Executed for high treason on Tower Hill after delivering Pontefract Castle to rebels of the Pilgrimage of Grace.
Robert Constable	6 July 1537	Hanged for treason in Hull after the Pilgrimage of Grace.
Robert Aske	12 July 1537	Hanged for treason at Clifford's Tower after leading rebellion against dissolution of lesser monasteries in Yorkshire.
Thomas Johnson	20 September 1537	Carthusian hermit executed by starvation for treason at Newgate Prison.
Mabel Brigge	April 1538	Executed for treason after committing to a black fast.
Edward Neville	8 December 1538	Executed for treason.
Henry Courtenay, Marquess of Exeter	9 December 1538	Feudal baron of Okehampton and Plympton, grandson of King Edward IV. Beheaded for treason after being implicated in the Exeter Conspiracy to overthrow the King.
Henry Pole, 1st Baron Montagu	9 January 1539	Descendant of George Plantagenet. Beheaded for treason and his role in the Exeter conspiracy
Nicholas Carew	3 March 1539	Beheaded for treason after being implicated in the Exeter Conspiracy to overthrow the King.
Hugh Faringdon	14 November 1539	Benedictine Abbot of Reading Abbey. Hanged, drawn, and quartered for treason at the inner gatehouse.
John Eynon	15 November 1539	Hanged, drawn, and quartered for treason at the inner gatehouse of Reading Abbey.
Adam Damlip	early 1540s	Executed for seditious libel and treason in Calais.
Thomas Cromwell	28 July 1540	Former Chancellor of the Exchequer, Principal Secretary, Master of the Rolls, Lord Privy Seal, Governor of the Isle of Wight, and Lord Great Chamberlain. Executed for treason and heresy at Tower Hill after arranging King Henry VIII's marriage to Anne of Cleves.
Walter Hungerford	28 July 1540	Executed for misprison of treason and buggery due to his support for Cromwell.
Thomas Abel	30 July 1540	Catholic priest. Hanged for treason.
Robert Barnes	30 July 1540	Lutheran reformer. Burned at the stake for Heresy.
Giles Heron	August 1540	Executed for treason at Tower Hill.
Margaret Pole, Countess of Salisbury	27 May 1541	Executed after being imprisoned in the Tower of London for two years.
Sir John Neville	15 June 1541	Executed for treason for failing to report a planned rebellion.
Leonard Grey, 1st Viscount Grane	28 July 1541	Lord Deputy of Ireland. Executed for treason after allegedly aiding his nephew Gerald FitzGerald, 11th Earl of Kildare's escape to France.
Francis Dereham	10 December 1541	Executed for adultery with Catherine Howard.
Thomas Culpeper	10 December 1541	Executed for adultery with Catherine Howard.
Catherine Howard	13 February 1542	Former Queen consort of England. Executed for treason under an ex poste facto act of attainder requiring queen consort to reveal their sexual history within 20 days of their marriage to the King and forbidding inciting adultery.
Jane Boleyn	13 February 1542	Sister in law of Anne Boleyn and also the widow of Lord Rochford (George Boleyn) lady-in-waiting to Anne of Cleves and Catherine Howard. Executed for treason.
German Gardiner	7 March 1544	Executed for treason.
Anne Askew	16 July 1546	Burned at the stake in Smithfield for heresy
Henry Howard, Earl of Surrey	19 January 1547	Executed for treason. Final execution of King Henry VIII.

== In the reign of Edward VI (1547–1553) ==
Convict	Date of Execution	Details
Thomas Seymour, 1st Baron Seymour of Sudeley	20 March 1549	Executed for treason after breaking into the King's apartments at Hampton Court Palace.
Robert Kett	7 December 1549	Hanged for treason in Wymondham after leading Kett's Rebellion.
Humphrey Arundell	27 January 1550	Hanged, drawn, and quartered at the Tower of London for treason after leading the Prayer Book Rebellion.
Edward Seymour, 1st Duke of Somerset	22 January 1552	Lord Protector of the Realm during the King's minority. Executed for felony after a coup d'état led by John Dudley, 1st Duke of Northumberland.

== In the reign of Mary I (1553–1558) ==
Convict	Date of Execution	Details
John Dudley, 1st Duke of Northumberland	22 August 1553	Lord President of the Council under King Edward VI. Executed for not recognising Mary as Queen and attempting to support his daughter-in-law Lady Jane Grey's rival claim to the throne. Renounced Protestantism and converted to Catholicism before his death.
Sir John Gates	22 August 1553	Executed for leading military expedition against Queen Mary in East Anglia. Renounced Protestantism and converted to Catholicism before his death.
Sir Thomas Palmer	22 August 1553	Executed for not recognising Mary as Queen. Refused to convert to Catholicism before his death.
Lady Jane Grey	12 February 1554	Former de facto Queen of England and Ireland. Executed for high treason at Tower Hill under the Third Succession Act and the Treason Act 1547 establishing Queen Mary as the legitimate heir to the throne.
Guilford Dudley	12 February 1554	Former de facto king consort of England and Ireland. Executed for high treason at Tower Hill.
Henry Grey, Duke of Suffolk	23 February 1554	Beheaded for high treason after supporting his daughter Lady Jane Grey's claim to the throne.
Sir Henry Isley	February 1554	Executed for role in Wyatt's Rebellion.
Sir Thomas Wyatt	11 April 1554	Executed for leading anti-Spanish rebellion against Queen Mary in protest of her marriage to King Philip II.
Sir William Thomas	18 May 1554	Welsh member of the Privy Council and scholar of the Italian language and history. Hanged, drawn, and quartered for treason.
John Rogers	4 February 1555	Burned at the stake for heresy for role in drafting the Matthew Bible.
John Hooper	9 February 1555	Anglican Bishop of Gloucester and Worcester. Burnt at the stake in Gloucester during the Marian Persecutions.
Nicholas Ridley, Bishop of London	16 October 1555	Anglican Bishop of London. One of the Oxford Martyrs burnt at the stake.
Hugh Latimer	16 October 1555	Anglican Bishop of Worcester. One of the Oxford Martyrs burnt at the stake.
Thomas Cranmer	21 March 1556	Anglican Archbishop of Canterbury. Author of the Book of Common Prayer and prominent supporter of Henry VIII's divorce from Catherine of Aragon and the Acts of Supremacy. Executed for heresy.

== In the reign of Elizabeth I (1558–1603) ==
Convict	Date of Execution	Details
Thomas Howard, 4th Duke of Norfolk	2 June 1572	Executed for treason at Tower Hill for his role in the Ridolfi Plot.
Thomas Percy, 7th Earl of Northumberland	22 August 1572	Publicly beheaded for treason in York for his role in the Rising of the North, a rebellion of Catholic Northern English nobles to place Mary, Queen of Scots on the English throne.
Edmund Campion	1 December 1581	English Catholic priests hanged, drawn, and quartered for treason in Tyburn. One of the Forty Martyrs of England and Wales canonised by Pope Paul VI in 1970.
Alexander Briant	1 December 1581	English Catholic priests hanged, drawn, and quartered for treason in Tyburn. One of the Forty Martyrs of England and Wales canonised by Pope Paul VI in 1970.
Ralph Sherwin	1 December 1581	English Catholic priests hanged, drawn, and quartered for treason in Tyburn. One of the Forty Martyrs of England and Wales canonised by Pope Paul VI in 1970.
Francis Throckmorton	10 July 1584	Executed for high treason for leading the Throckmorton Plot
William Parry	2 March 1585	Executed in Old Palace Yard after confessing to a plot to assassinate the Queen.
Sir Anthony Babington	20 September 1586	Hanged, drawn, and quartered for participating in the Babington Plot.
Chidiock Tichborne	20 September 1586	Hanged, drawn, and quartered for participating in the Babington Plot.
Sir Thomas Salisbury	21 September 1586	Hanged, drawn, and quartered for participating in the Babington Plot.
John Ballard	21 September 1586	Hanged, drawn, and quartered for participating in the Babington Plot.
Henry Donn	21 September 1586	Hanged, drawn, and quartered for participating in the Babington Plot.
Mary, Queen of Scots	8 February 1587	Beheaded for treason at Fotheringhay Castle after being implicated in the Babington Plot.
George Errington	29 November 1596	Hanged, drawn and quartered in York for treason. Beatified as one of the Eighty-five martyrs of England and Wales by Pope John Paul II in 1987.
William Knight	29 November 1596	Hanged, drawn and quartered in York for treason. Beatified as one of the Eighty-five martyrs of England and Wales by Pope John Paul II in 1987.
William Gibson	29 November 1596	Hanged, drawn and quartered in York for treason. Beatified as one of the Eighty-five martyrs of England and Wales by Pope John Paul II in 1987.
Henry Abbot	4 July 1597	Hanged, drawn and quartered in York for treason. Beatified as one of the Eighty-five martyrs of England and Wales by Pope John Paul II in 1987.
Robert Devereux, 2nd Earl of Essex	25 February 1601	Beheaded for treason at Tower Green after leading Essex's Rebellion.
Sir Gelli Meyrick	13 March 1601	Hanged for treason in Tyburn for participating in Essex's Rebellion.
Sir Henry Cuffe	13 March 1601	Hanged for treason in Tyburn for participating in Essex's Rebellion.
Sir Christopher Blount	18 March 1601	Beheaded for treason at Tower Hill for participating in Essex's Rebellion
Sir Charles Danvers	18 March 1601	Beheaded for treason at Tower Hill for participating in Essex's Rebellion
