= Carthusian Martyrs of London =

English Catholic monks and martyrs

Saints and Blesseds Carthusian Martyrs of London O. Cart.
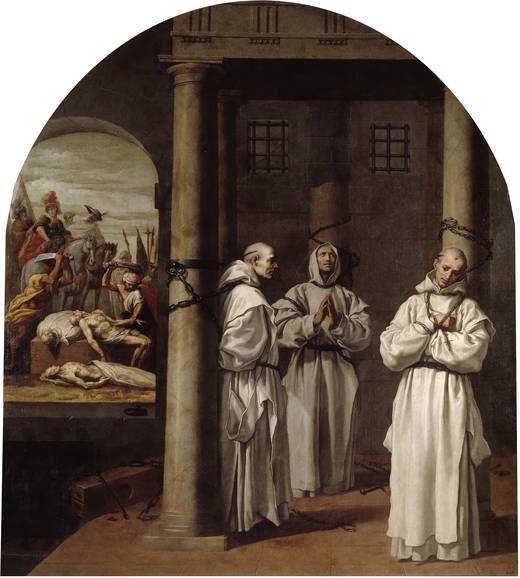
- Vicente Carducho. Martyrdom of the priors of the English Carthusians of London, Nottingham and Axholme. c.1626

Martyrs
- Died: 4 May 1535 (John Houghton and 2 companions) - 4 August 1540 (William Horne) 7 died at Tyburn, 2 died at York, 9 died at Newgate Prison
- Venerated in: Roman Catholic Church
- Beatified: 15 were beatified by Pope Leo XIII on 29 December 1886
- Canonized: 3 were canonized by Pope Paul VI on 25 October 1970
- Feast: 4 May, various for individual martyrs
- Attributes: martyr's palm

The Carthusian Martyrs of London were the Carthusian monks of the London Charterhouse who were put to death by the English state from 4 May 1535 to 20 September 1537. The method of execution was typically hanging, disemboweling while still alive and quartering. Others were imprisoned and left to starve to death. The group also includes two monks who were brought to that house from the Charterhouses of Beauvale and Axholme and similarly dealt with. The total was 18 men, all of whom have been formally recognized by the Catholic Church as martyrs.

At the outset of the "King's Great Matter", (the euphemism given to King Henry VIII's decision to divorce Catherine of Aragon, marry Anne Boleyn and break legal ties with the Pope) the government was anxious to secure the public acquiescence of the Carthusian monks, since they enjoyed great prestige for the austerity and sincerity of their way of life. When this attempt failed, the only alternative was to annihilate the resistance, since their refusal put the prestige of the monks in opposition to the king's will. This took the form of a long process of attrition.

== The First Group ==
Despite their strict enclosure, the monks of the London Charterhouse were held in high esteem and had considerable influence among the people, as many used to consult the Carthusians for spiritual advice.

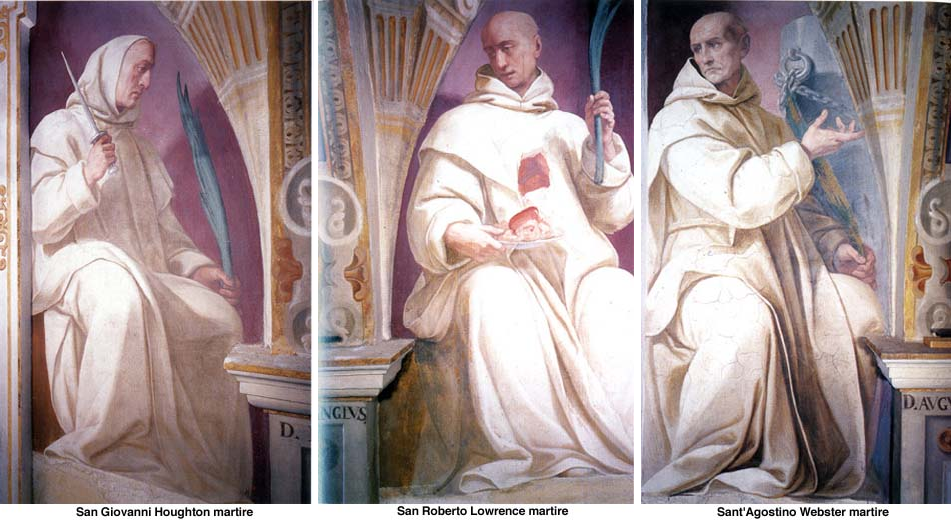
Portraits of Saints John Houghton, Robert Lawrence and Augustine Webster. Portraits from the Certosa di Bologna. They were the first Carthusians to be martyred in England.

On 4 May 1535 the authorities sent to their death at Tyburn, Middlesex three leading English Carthusians, Doms John Houghton, prior of the London house, Robert Lawrence and Augustine Webster, respectively priors of Beauvale and Axholme, along with a Bridgettine monk, Richard Reynolds of Syon Abbey and a secular priest John Haile.

== The Second Group ==
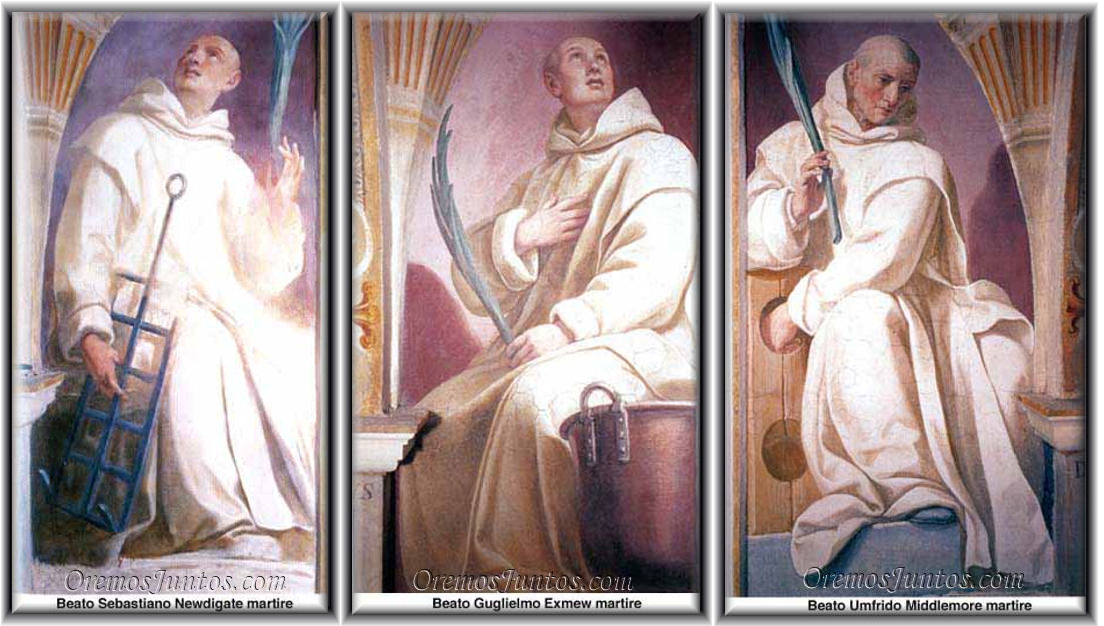
Portraits of Blesseds Sebastian Newdigate, William Exmew, and Humphrey Middlemore from the Certosa di Bologna.

Little more than a month later, it was the turn of three leading monks of the London house: Doms Humphrey Middlemore, William Exmew and Sebastian Newdigate. They were bound upright in chains for 13 days before being taken to die at Tyburn, Middlesex on 19 June. Newdigate was a personal friend of Henry VIII, who is said to have visited him twice in the prison to persuade him to give in, but in vain.

== The Third Group ==
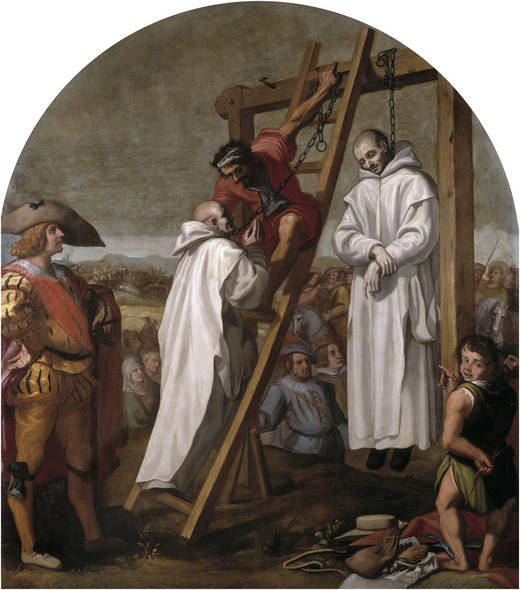
Vicente Carducho. Martyrdom of Fathers John Rochester and James Walworth.

The next move was to seize four more monks of the community, two being taken to the Carthusian house at Beauvale in Nottinghamshire, while Dom John Rochester and Dom James Walworth were taken to the Charterhouse of St. Michael in Hull in Yorkshire. They were made an "example" of on 11 May 1537, when, condemned for refusing to sign the Act of Supremacy, they were hanged in chains from the York city battlements until dead.

== The Fourth Group ==
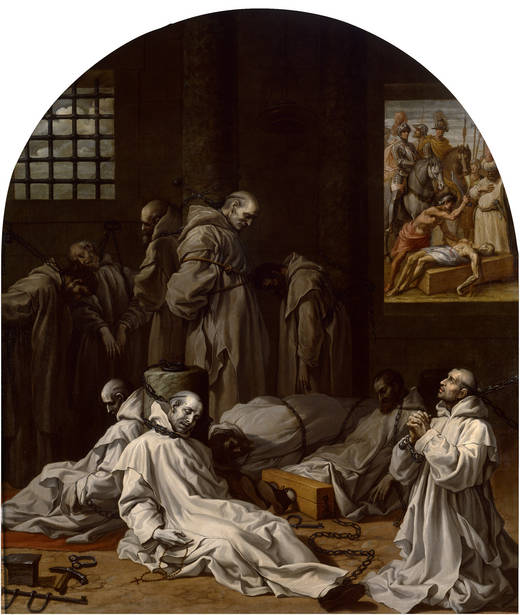
Vicente Carducho. 'Imprisonment and death of the ten members of the London Charterhouse' (1632). Museo del Prado

On 18 May 1537 the 20 choir monks and 18 lay brothers remaining in the London Charterhouse were required to take the Oath of Supremacy. Of these, Doms Thomas Johnson, Richard Bere, Thomas Green (priests), and John Davy (a deacon), refused. Richard Bere was the nephew, and namesake of, Richard Bere the Abbot of Glastonbury (1493–1525). The younger Bere abandoned his studies in the law, and became a Carthusian in February 1523. Thomas Green may be the Thomas Greenwood who obtained a bachelor's degree at Oxford, and later a Master's degree at Cambridge in 1511, who became Fellow of St John's College, Cambridge in 1515 and was awarded the Doctorate in Divinity in 1532. This connection with Cambridge would associate him with St. John Fisher.

Likewise, of the lay brothers, Robert Salt, William Greenwood, Thomas Redyng, Thomas Scryven, Walter Pierson, and William Horne refused. As to the rest of the community, they voted in favour of the monastery being "surrendered", though they stayed on in the premises for the rest of the year.

Those refusing the oath were all sent on 29 May to Newgate Prison, and treated as had been their fellow Carthusians in June 1535. In the prison they were chained standing and with their hands tied behind them to posts. Plague and typhus, rife among the prison's inmates in the summer weather, killed five of the group, two more coming close to death.

According to legend, Margaret Clement (née Giggs), who had been raised by St. Thomas More, bribed the gaoler to let her have access to the prisoners, and, disguised as a milkmaid, carried in a milk-can full of meat which she fed to them. She also relieved them as best she could of the filth. However, King Henry became suspicious and began to ask whether they were already dead, and Thomas Cromwell was angered to hear the prisoners had been left to die. When this filtered back to the gaoler, he became too afraid to let Margaret enter again. For a brief time she was allowed to go on the roof and uncover the tiles, and let down meat in a basket as near as she could to their mouths. This method meant the monks could get little or nothing from the basket, and in any case the gaoler became too afraid and stopped any contact.

The lay brother William Greenwood died first, on 6 June, and two days later the deacon Dom John Davy, on 8 June. Brother Robert Salt died on 9 June, Brother Walter Pierson and Dom Thomas Green on 10 June, and Brothers Thomas Scryven and Thomas Redyng on 15 June and 16 June, respectively. These last named had survived a remarkably long time. It seems likely that at this point the King and his Council had decided upon a change of plan which entailed bringing the survivors to execution and that Thomas Cromwell gave orders that those still living were to be given food so as to keep them alive. At any rate, of the priests, Dom Richard Bere, did not die till 9 August, and Dom Thomas Johnson not until 20 September.

== A Lone Survivor ==
William Horne managed to fight all the illnesses and conditions. Refusing to abandon his religious habit, he was not attainted till 1540, when he was hanged, disembowelled, and quartered at Tyburn on August 4, 1540, along with five other Catholics: the two laymen Robert Bird and Giles Heron, Friar Lawrence Cook, Carmelite Prior of Doncaster, the Benedictine monk, Dom Thomas Epson, and (probably) the secular priest William Bird, Rector of Fittleton and Vicar of Bradford, Wiltshire. King Henry looked to make an example of both Catholics and reformers, executing men from both groups.

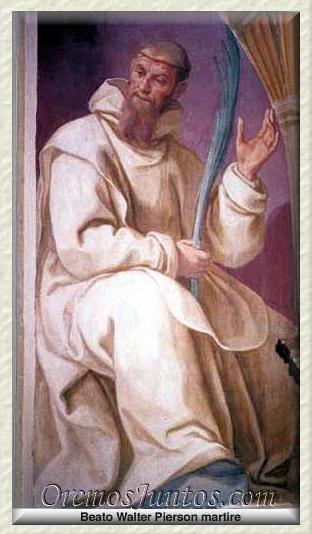
Portrait of Blessed Walter Pierson from the Certosa di Bologna

== A Summary List of Carthusian Martyrs ==
- Saint John Houghton, prior of the London Charterhouse, executed at Tyburn, London, on 4 May 1535.
- Saint Robert Lawrence, prior of Beauvale Charterhouse, executed at Tyburn, London, on 4 May 1535.
- Saint Augustine Webster, prior of Axholme Charterhouse, executed at Tyburn, London, on 4 May 1535.
- Blessed Humphrey Middlemore, vicar of the London Charterhouse, executed at Tyburn, London, on 19 June 1535.
- Blessed William Exmew, procurator of the London Charterhouse, executed at Tyburn, London, on 19 June 1535.
- Blessed Sebastian Newdigate, choir monk of the London Charterhouse, executed at Tyburn, London, on 19 June 1535.
- Blessed John Rochester, choir monk of the London Charterhouse, exiled by the government to the Charterhouse of St Michael at Hull in Yorkshire, executed at York on 11 May 1537 by being hanged in chains from the city battlements until dead.
- Blessed James Walworth, choir monk of the London Charterhouse, exiled by the government to the Charterhouse of St Michael at Hull in Yorkshire, executed at York on 11 May 1537 by being hanged in chains from the city battlements until dead.
- Blessed William Greenwood, laybrother of the London Charterhouse, died of illness in Newgate Prison, London on 6 June 1537.
- Blessed John Davy, deacon, choir monk of the London Charterhouse, died of illness in Newgate Prison on 8 June 1537.
- Blessed Robert Salt, laybrother of the London Charterhouse, died of illness in Newgate Prison, London on 9 June 1537.
- Blessed Walter Pierson, laybrother of the London Charterhouse, died of illness in Newgate Prison, London on 10 June 1537
- Blessed Thomas Green (perhaps alias Thomas Greenwood), choir monk of the London Charterhouse, died of illness in Newgate Prison, London on 10 June 1537.
- Blessed Thomas Scryven, laybrother of the London Charterhouse, died of illness in Newgate Prison, London on 15 June 1537.
- Blessed Thomas Redyng, laybrother of the London Charterhouse, died of illness in Newgate Prison, London on 16 June 1537.
- Blessed Richard Bere, choir monk of the London Charterhouse, died of illness in Newgate Prison, London on 9 August 1537
- Blessed Thomas Johnson, choir monk of the London Charterhouse, died of illness in Newgate Prison, London on 20 September 1537.
- Blessed William Horne, laybrother of the London Charterhouse, hanged, disembowelled, and quartered at Tyburn, London on 4 August 1540.

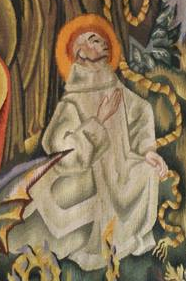
Blessed Richard Bere. Detail from a tapestry within the Our Lady of Glastonbury Catholic Church

== Veneration ==
They were beatified in 1886 by Pope Leo XIII. Houghton, Lawrence, and Webster were canonized by Pope Paul VI in 1970. There is a memorial plaque at Charterhouse Square. A private commemoration ceremony takes place each year at the Carthusian martyrs plaque on 4 May, the date of John Houghton's execution.

== In art ==
There are paintings of four of the Carthusian martyrs - Blessed William Exmew, Blessed Thomas Johnson, Blessed Richard Bere, and Blessed Thomas Green - at the Certosa di Bologna. Vicente Carducho was employed by the monks of the Cartuja de El Paular to decorate the great cloister with 54 canvases of historical figures. Twenty-seven represent the life of St. Bruno, twenty-seven are of martyrs.

== See also ==
- Carthusian
- Carthusian Martyrs
- Eighty-five martyrs of England and Wales
- Forty Martyrs of England and Wales
- Hermit
- List of Catholic martyrs of the English Reformation

== Sources ==
- Webpage: Immaculate Heart of Mary's Hermitage:Carthusian Saints, Blesseds and Martyrs
