= John Rochester (martyr) =

English Carthusian and martyr

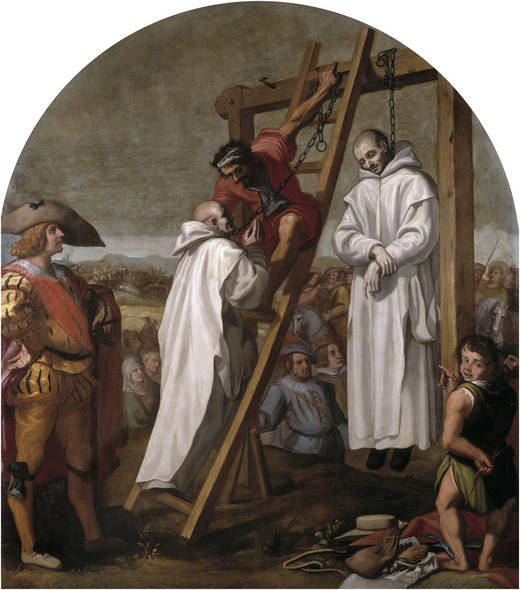
Vicente Carducho: Martyrdom of John Rochester and James Walworth. Monastery of El Paular (Spain).

John Rochester (c. 1498–1537) was an English Carthusian choir monk and martyr. He was hanged at York for refusing to concede King Henry VIII's supremacy over the church.

== Background ==
The government was at first anxious to secure the public acquiescence of the monks of the London Charterhouse regarding royal supremacy in ecclesiastical matters, since for the austerity and sincerity of their mode of life they enjoyed great prestige. Having failed in this, the only alternative was to annihilate the resistance since a refusal engaged the prestige of the monks in the opposite sense. On 4 May 1535 the authorities sent to their death at Tyburn Tree three leading English Carthusians: John Houghton, the prior of the London Charterhouse; Robert Lawrence, prior of Beauvale; and Augustine Webster prior of Axholme. Little more than a month later, it was the turn of three leading monks of the London house: Humphrey Middlemore, William Exmew and Sebastian Newdigate, who were to die at Tyburn Tree on 19 June. This process of attrition was to claim as its victims no less than fifteen of the London Carthusians.

== Life ==
John was the third son of John Rochester, of Terling, Essex, and Grisold Writtle, daughter of Walter Writtle, of Bobbingworth. He was the brother of Robert Rochester, Comptroller of the Household and a member of the Privy Council under Queen Mary.

He joined the Carthusian convent in London and strenuously opposed the new doctrine of the royal supremacy. Four more monks of the convent were seized; two being taken to the Charterhouse at Beauvale in Nottinghamshire, while John Rochester and James Walworth were taken to the Charterhouse of St. Michael in Hull, Yorkshire.

=== Pilgrimage of Grace ===
That autumn, the government had just succeeded in putting down a rising in Lincolnshire, when on 13 October 1536, the far more serious Pilgrimage of Grace began, mustering an enormous multitude of adherents, perhaps as many as 40,000. This time, having dealt with the problem, the government was desperate to stamp out any centres of resistance. Since one of the flashpoints had been the Northern capital of York, it was necessary for the government to mount a lesson in the city.

=== Executions ===
The two London monks were brought from Hull to York and brought before the Lord President of the North, the Duke of Norfolk, on trumped up treason charges, and condemned to death. On 11 May 1537, both were hanged and their bodies hung in chains from the city battlements until they fell to pieces.

Both monks were beatified by Pope Leo XIII in 1888.

== Sources ==
- Metcalfe, Walter C., ed. (1879). The Visitations of Essex, Part II. Vol. XIV. London: Harleian Society. p. 622.
