= William Exmew =

English Roman Catholic priest and martyr

Blessed William Exmew O.Cart.
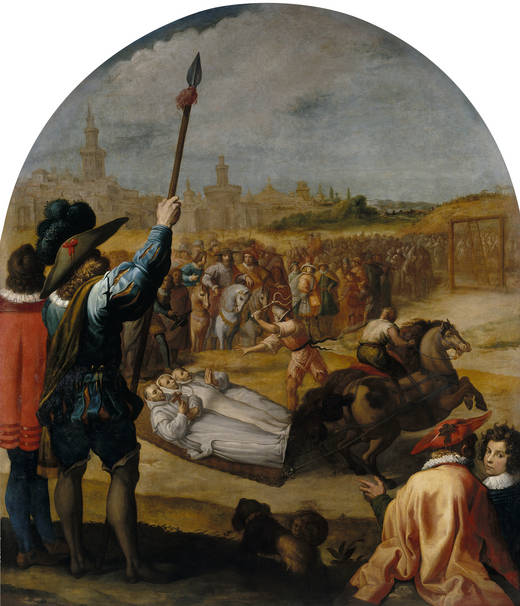
- Vicente Carducho: Martyrdom of Humphrey Middlemore, William Exmew and Sebastian Newdigate. Monastery of El Paular (Spain).
- Died: 19 June 1535
- Honored in: Roman Catholicism
- Beatified: 9 December 1886 by Pope Leo XIII

William Exmew, O.Cart (died 19 June 1535, Tyburn) was an English Catholic priest and Carthusian hermit. He was hanged, drawn, and quartered at Tyburn and is honoured as a martyr by the Catholic Church. Exmew and his brother Carthusian martyrs were beatified by Pope Leo XIII on 9 December 1886.

== Life ==
Exmew was one of the first members of Christ's College, Cambridge, then just founded by Margaret Beaufort, Countess of Richmond, the mother of Henry VII. He became a proficient classical scholar. Entering the London Charterhouse, he was soon raised, at the age of twenty-eight, to the office of vicar or (sub-prior) then in 1534 he was named procurator. He was said to have had a particular reputation for learning, being well-versed in Greek and Latin.

The Crown was at first anxious to secure the public acquiescence of the monks of the London Charterhouse in the matter of the break with Rome, since for the austerity and sincerity of their mode of life they enjoyed great prestige. When there was unexpected resistance, they resorted to terror. On 4 May 1535 the authorities sent to their death at Tyburn Tree three leading English Carthusians, Doms John Houghton, prior of the London house, Robert Lawrence and Augustine Webster, respectively priors of Beauvale and Axholme.

Two days later William Exmew and the vicar, Humphrey Middlemore, were denounced to Thomas Cromwell by Thomas Bedyll, one of the royal commissioners, as being "obstinately determined to suffer all extremities rather than to alter their opinion" with regard to the primacy of the pope. Three weeks later they and another monk of the community, Sebastian Newdigate, were arrested and thrown into the Marshalsea, where they were made to stand in chains, bound to posts, and were left in that position for thirteen days. After that, they were removed to the Tower of London. Named in the same indictment as Bishop John Fisher, they were brought to trial at Westminster on 11 June where they pleaded not guilty to a charge of high treason. They were steadfast, however, in asserting their adherence to Catholic teaching on the subject of spiritual supremacy and denied that King Henry VIII had any right to the title of head of the Church of England.

They were consequently condemned to death as traitors, and were hanged, drawn, and quartered at Tyburn Tree on 19 June 1535. This process of attrition was to claim fifteen of the London Carthusians.

There is a painting of Exmew in the church of the Certosa di Bologna.

== See also ==
- Carthusian Martyrs
- Forty Martyrs of England and Wales
