= Thomas Johnson (monk) =

English Carthusian and martyr

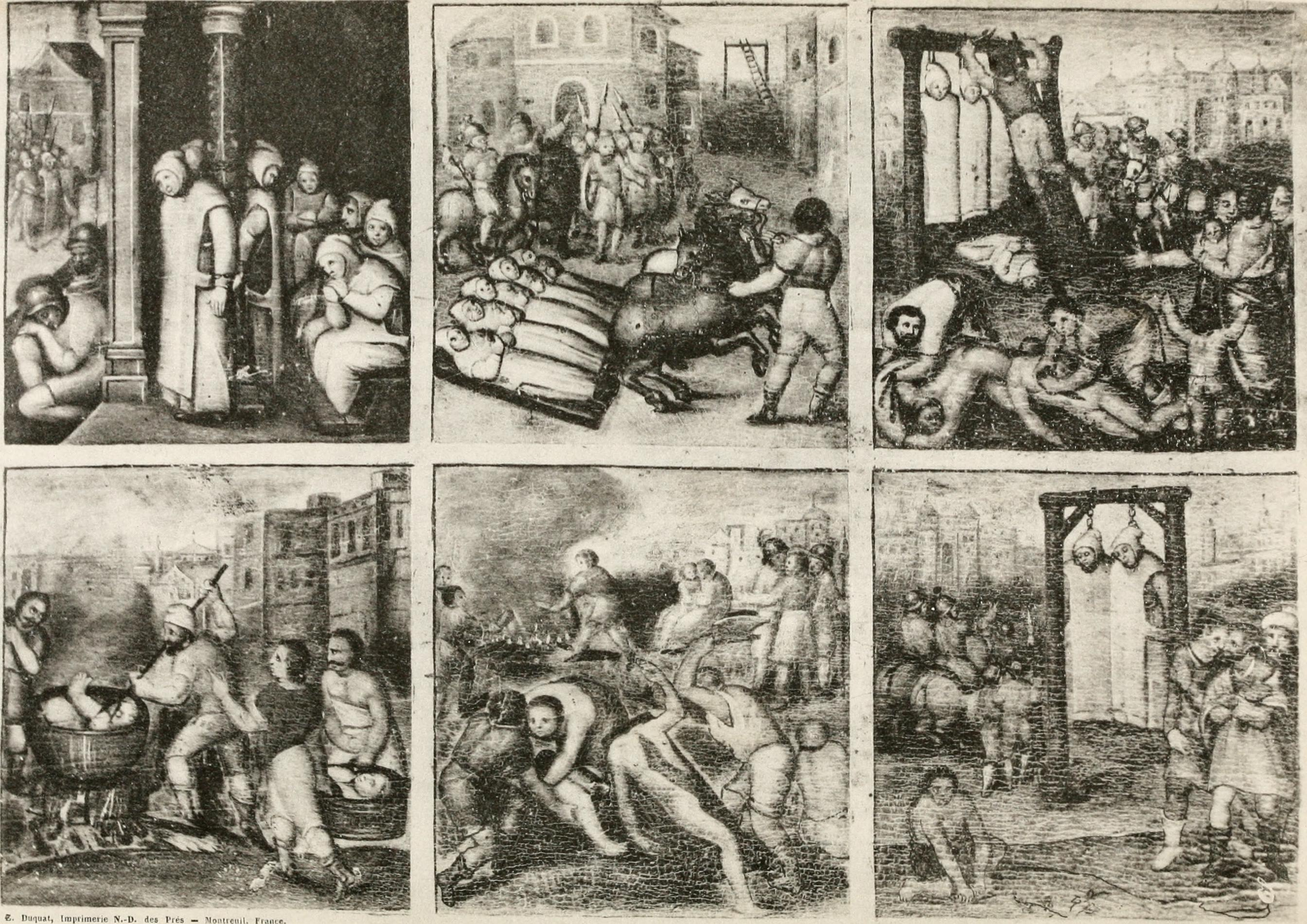
The martyrs of the London Charterhouse (the Carthusians left for starvation at the upper left edge)

Thomas Johnson, OCart, (died 20 September 1537) was a Carthusian who was killed by starvation in Tudor England. He is venerated in the Roman Catholic Church as a martyr and has been beatified. His feast day is on 4 May.

== Biography ==
On May 18, 1537, 18 lay brothers and 20 choir monks of the London Charterhouse were arrested to force them to sign the Oath of Supremacy. Johnson, six lay brothers and four choir monks refused.

Like his brothers, after his imprisonment in Newgate Prison, he was chained standing up and left to starve. Margaret Clement was temporarily able to bring him and the other Carthusians some food, by entering in disguise, but after King Henry VIII became suspicious from their continued survival, this was ended. Johnson took the longest to die of starvation and died on 20 September 1537.

A lay brother of the Charterhouse named Horne survived and was not executed until 1540. In that year he was hanged, disembowelled, and quartered at Tyburn.

Thomas Johnson and the other Carthusian Martyrs were beatified by Pope Leo XIII in 1886.

There are paintings of Johnson along with other Carthusian martyrs in the church of the former Charterhouse of Bologna.

== See also ==
- Carthusian Martyrs
- Forty Martyrs of England and Wales
