= Sebastian Newdigate =

English Roman Catholic priest and martyr

Saint Sebastian Newdigate O.Cart
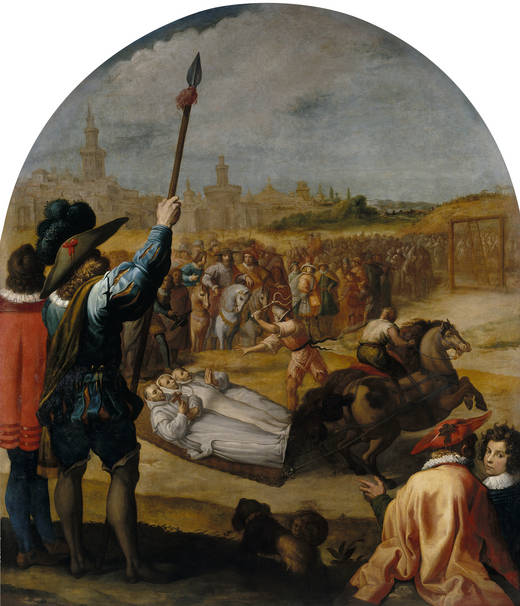
- Vicente Carducho: Martyrdom of Humphrey Middlemore, William Exmew and Sebastian Newdigate. Monastery of El Paular (Spain).
- Born: 7 September 1500
- Died: 19 June 1535 (aged 34); Tyburn, London
- Spouse: Katherine Hampden
- Children: Amphyllis Newdigate; Elizabeth Newdigate
- Parent(s): John Newdigate, Amphyllis Neville

Sebastian Newdigate, O.Cart (7 September 1500 – 19 June 1535) was the seventh child of John Newdigate, Sergeant-at-law. He spent his early life at court, and later became a Carthusian monk. He was executed for treason on 19 June 1535 for his refusal to accept Henry VIII's assumption of supremacy over the Church in England. His death was considered a martyrdom, and he was beatified by the Catholic Church.

== Family ==
Sebastian Newdigate, born 7 September 1500 at Harefield, Middlesex, was the seventh of the fourteen children of John Newdigate (d. 15 August 1528), esquire, Sergeant-at-law in 1510 and King's Serjeant in 1520, and Amphyllis Neville (d. 1544), daughter and heiress of John Neville of Rolleston, Nottinghamshire, "a kinsman of the Earls of Westmorland".

The births of Sebastian Newdigate and his brothers and sisters are listed in the Newdigate Cartulary:

- John Newdigate, son and heir, born at the Whitefriars in Fleet Street, London, 4 January 1490.
- Charles Newdigate, born 10 July 1493.
- William Newdigate, born at the Whitefriars 3 February 1495.
- Jane Newdigate (d. 7 July 1571), born at Harefield, Middlesex, 18 August 1496. Jane Newdigate married Sir Robert Dormer, and was the grandmother of Jane Dormer.
- Mary Newdigate, born at Harefield 21 September 1497.
- Barbara Newdigate, born at the White Friars 4 November 1498.
- Sebastian Newdigate, born at Harefield 7 September 1500. The entry records that his godparents were William Bynchester, George Osborne and Joan Weddon, and that he 'after became a delicate courtier'.
- Anthony Newdigate, born at Harefield 17 November 1502.
- Silvester Newdigate, born at Harefield 16 January 1504.
- Dorothy Newdigate, born at Harefield 20 June 1505.
- George Newdigate, born at Harefield 26 April 1507.
- Sybil Newdigate, born at Harefield 3 July 1509.
- Dunstan Newdigate/Bonaventure Newdigate (twins), born at Harefield on Saint Dunstan's Day, 19 May 1510.

== Life ==
Newdigate was educated at court, and may have studied at Cambridge. He became a member of Henry VIII's Privy Chamber, and is said to have enjoyed the King's favour.

According to Bainbridge, Newdigate married Katherine Hampden, widow of Henry Ferrers, and daughter of Sir John Hampden of Great Hampden, by whom he had two daughters, Amphyllis and Elizabeth. Crisp also states that Newdigate married, and by an unnamed wife who died in 1524 had an only daughter, Amphyllis, who married Thomas Breme after 3 September 1545.

However Hendriks and Doreau question whether Newdigate ever married, and Richardson states that Newdigate's alleged wife, Katherine Hampden, widow of Henry Ferrers, and daughter and heiress of Sir John Hampden, married a different member of the Newdigate family, Thomas Newdigate, gentleman, of Wivelsfield, Sussex, the son of Walter Newdigate.

It is said that Newdigate entered the London Charterhouse, a Carthusian priory, after his wife's death in 1524, However it is unlikely that Newdigate's admission as a postulant could have occurred prior to 24 October 1526, when the King granted him a wardship.

Not long after Newdigate became a novice, his sister, Jane, who in 1512 had married Sir Robert Dormer of Wing, Buckinghamshire, visited the Prior, William Tynbygh, to express her concern about Newdigate's suitability for the strictness of the monastic life after his early years at court. Despite his sister's misgivings, Newdigate remained at the Charterhouse. He was ordained a deacon on 3 June 1531, and was ordained to the priesthood before his death.

In 1534 Henry VIII required his subjects to take the Oath of Succession recognizing Anne Boleyn as his lawful wife. Newdigate signed the oath "in as far as the law of God permits" on 6 June 1534. However the Carthusian community at the Charterhouse refused to accept the King's assumption of supremacy over the English church, and on 4 May 1535 the Prior of the Charterhouse, John Houghton, was executed, together with two other Carthusian priors, Robert Lawrence and Augustine Webster, priors respectively of Beauvale and Axholme.

Newdigate and two other monks, Humphrey Middlemore and William Exmew, were arrested on 25 May 1535 for denying the King's supremacy, and imprisoned in the Marshalsea, where they were kept for fourteen days bound to pillars, standing upright, with iron rings round their necks, hands, and feet. Newdigate was visited there by the King, who is said to have come in disguise, and to have offered to load Newdigate with riches and honours if he would conform. He was then brought before the Privy Council, and sent to the Tower of London, where Henry again visited him, but was unable to change his mind. The three monks were condemned to death for treason on 11 June, and on 19 June were dragged to Tyburn on hurdles, and hanged, drawn and quartered. Their remains were put on display at various locations in London.

This process of attrition was to claim as its victims no fewer than fifteen of the London Carthusians.

Newdigate's courage is said to have inspired members of his family, as well as others, to remain steadfast in their Catholicism. Along with the other members of his Order who suffered martyrdom at this time, Newdigate was beatified by Pope Leo XIII on 9 December 1886.
