= Richard Reynolds (martyr) =

English Roman Catholic saint

Saint Richard Reynolds O.Ss.S
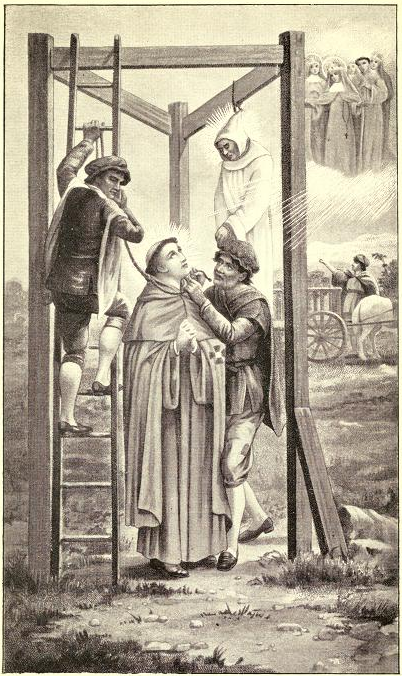
- Illustration from The Angel of Syon by Dom Adam Hamilton, O.S.B.

Bridgettine Martyr, "The Angel of Syon" Forty Martyrs of England and Wales
- Born: c. 1492; Devon, England
- Died: 4 May 1535 (aged 42 - 43); Tyburn, London, England
- Venerated in: Roman Catholic Church
- Beatified: 29 December 1886 by Pope Leo XIII
- Canonized: 25 October 1970 by Pope Paul VI
- Feast: 4 May (individual and all English Martyrs); 25 October (collectively with Forty Martyrs of England and Wales)
- Attributes: Book or bible Martyr's palm Bridgettine habit Holding a noose or worn in neck

Richard Reynolds, O.Ss.S (c.1492 – 4 May 1535) was an English Bridgettine monk executed in London for refusing the Oath of Supremacy to King Henry VIII. He was canonised by Pope Paul VI in 1970, among the Forty Martyrs of England and Wales.

== Life ==
Richard Reynolds was a Bridgettine monk of the Syon Abbey, founded in Twickenham by Henry V. He was born in Devon in 1492, educated at Corpus Christi College, Cambridge, and joined the Abbey in 1513. Reginald Pole is quoted as saying that Reynolds was the only English monk well-versed in the three principal languages of Latin, Greek, and Hebrew.

Dom Hamilton is of the opinion that as Reynolds was the most renowned spiritual counsellor of the Syon community, he would have likely been consulted by Elizabeth Barton, the Holy Maid of Kent, who had been executed at Tyburn almost a year prior for speaking out against the king's marriage to Anne Boleyn. Reynolds had previously arranged a meeting between Elizabeth Barton and Thomas More. It was his connection to Barton that particularly compromised Reynolds in the view of the Crown officers.

Reynolds was arrested and imprisoned in the Tower of London around the middle of April 1535, along with the Carthusian priors John Houghton, Robert Lawrence and Augustine Webster (a monk of Sheen Priory in Richmond). All four were tried for the denial of the royal supremacy.

Against Reynolds, there was the additional charge of attempting to dissuade people from submitting to the king's authority. A witness claimed that Reynolds had stated that the "Dowager Princess" (Queen Catherine) was the true queen. Reynolds denied that he had declared an opinion against the king, except in confession, as compelled thereto. The practice of suborning penitents to accuse their confessors was in vogue at that time.

All four were executed on 4 May 1535 by drawing and quartering at Tyburn Tree in London after being dragged through the streets. Also convicted of treason for speaking against the King's marriage to Anne Boleyn, and martyred with them on that day, was John Haile, the parish priest of Isleworth where Syon Abbey lay. The quarters of the body of Reynolds – the first man to refuse the oath – were chopped to pieces and hung in different parts of London, including the gate of Syon Abbey.

According to The Life of Sir Thomas More, by William Roper, More witnessed Reynolds and his three companions going to execution from his window in the Tower of London. Roper reports the event thus: "As Sir Thomas More in the Tower chanced on a time, looking out of his window, to behold one Master Reynolds, a religious, learned, and virtuous father of Sion and three monks of the Charterhouse, for the matters of the matrimony and Supremacy, going out of the Tower to execution - he, as one longing in that journey to have accompanied them, said unto my wife, then standing besides him: 'Lo, dost thou not see, Meg, that these blessed fathers be now as cheerfully going to their deaths as bridegrooms to their marriage? Wherefore thereby mayst thou see, mine own good daughter, what a great difference there is between such as have in effect spent all their days in a strait, hard, penitential, and painful life religiously, and such as have in the world, like worldly wretches, as thy poor father hath done, consumed all their time in pleasure and ease licentiously. For God, considering their long-continued life in most sore and grievous penance, will no longer suffer them to remain here in this vale of misery and iniquity, but speedily hence taketh them to the fruition of his everlasting deity.'"

According to the book The Angel of Syon, Reynolds said before his execution, "... after a sharp breakfast, they should have a sweet supper." Coincidentally, Blessed John Sugar is recorded having said the same phrase before his execution in 1604, but the author of the book, Dom Adam Hamilton, is uncertain if it originated with Reynolds.

== Veneration ==
He was beatified in 1886 and canonised by Pope Paul VI as one of the Forty Martyrs of England and Wales on 25 October 1970. His feast day is 4 May.

There is a statue commemorating Saint Richard Reynolds in Our Lady of Sorrows and St Bridget Roman Catholic Church, Isleworth.

A painting of the martyr is housed in the Church of St. Bridget in Rome.

There is a stained glass window of the martyr in St Etheldreda's Church in Ely Place. He is the figure on the right.

A section of the dissolved Syon Abbey is considered a relic of Reynolds, due to the fact that it supported the quartered remains of the martyr after his execution. The nuns of the Abbey took this section after the dissolution.

He is the patron of St Richard Reynolds Catholic College in Twickenham. The college is the federation of St Richard Reynolds Catholic High School and the new St Richard Reynolds Catholic Primary School for pupils aged 4 – 18.

== See also ==
- Syon Abbey
- Forty Martyrs of England and Wales
