= Humphrey Middlemore =

English Carthusian and martyr

Blessed Humphrey Middlemore OCart
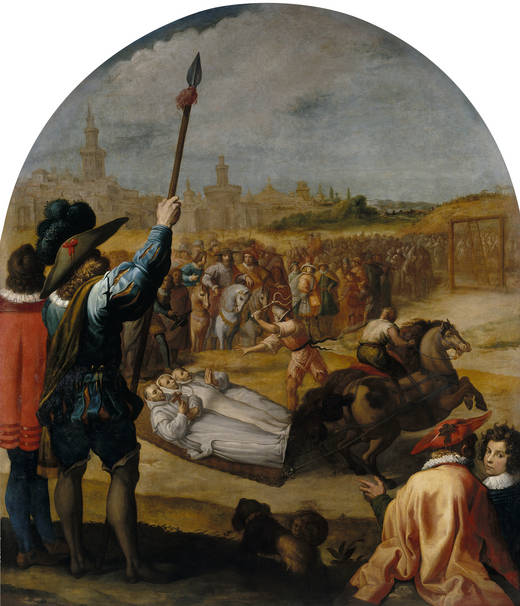
- Part of a stained glass window in St. Mary's Roman Catholic Church in Bridge Gate, Derby

Martyr
- Died: 19 June 1535; Tyburn, London, England
- Honored in: Roman Catholic Church
- Beatified: 29 December 1886 by Pope Leo XIII
- Feast: 19 June and 4 May
- Attributes: Carthusain habit, martyr's palm

Humphrey Middlemore, OCart (died 19 June 1535) was an English Catholic priest and Carthusian monk, who was executed for treason during the Tudor period. He is considered a martyr by the Catholic Church, and, along with other members of his religious order to meet that fate, was beatified by Pope Leo XIII on 9 December 1886.

== Life ==
Though the date of his birth is uncertain, his father was Thomas Middlemore of Edgbaston, Warwickshire, who had acquired his estate at Edgbaston by marriage with the heiress of Sir Henry Edgbaston. Humphrey's mother was Ann Lyttleton, of Pillaton Hall, Staffordshire. Attracted to the Carthusian Order, he entered the London Charterhouse, where he was professed and ordained. He was subsequently appointed to the office of procurator. He was esteemed by the prior, Dom John Houghton.

In 1534 the question of King Henry VIII's marriage with Anne Boleyn arose. The king was determined that the more prominent of his subjects should expressly acknowledge the validity of the marriage, and the right of succession of any issue therefrom. The Crown was at first anxious to secure the public acquiescence of the monks of the London Charterhouse in this matter, since they enjoyed great prestige for the austerity and sincerity of their mode of life. Accordingly, the royal commissions paid a visit to the Charterhouse, and required the monks to take the oath to that effect. Doms John Houghton and Humphrey Middlemore refused, and were, in consequence, imprisoned in the Tower of London; but, after a month's imprisonment, they were persuaded to take the oath conditionally, and were released.

In the following year, on 4 May 1535, the authorities sent to their death at Tyburn Tree for refusal to take the new Oath of Supremacy, three leading English Carthusians, first among them John Houghton, prior of the London house, but also Robert Lawrence and Augustine Webster, respectively priors of Beauvale and Axholme. This led to Middlemore becoming vicar of the community.Meanwhile, Thomas Bedyll, one of the royal commissioners, had again visited the Charterhouse, and endeavored, both by conversation and writing, to shake the faith of Middlemore and his community in the papal supremacy. His efforts left them unmoved, and, after debating with them, he obtained authority from Thomas Cromwell to arrest three leading monks of the London house: Middlemore, as the vicar, and with him Doms William Exmew and Sebastian Newdigate. All three were thrown them into prison, where they were treated with cruelty, being bound to posts with chains round their necks and legs, and compelled to remain thus day and night for two weeks. They were then brought before the council, and required to take the oath. They refused, and gave arguments from Scripture and the Church Fathers in favour of the papal supremacy.

They were accordingly condemned to death, and executed at Tyburn Tree on 19 June, being hanged, drawn and quartered. This was a little more than a month after their fellow monks. This process of attrition was to claim fifteen of the London Carthusians.
