= Certosa di Bologna =

Cemetery in Bologna, Italy

Coordinates: 44°29′47″N 11°18′34″E

Certosa of Bologna
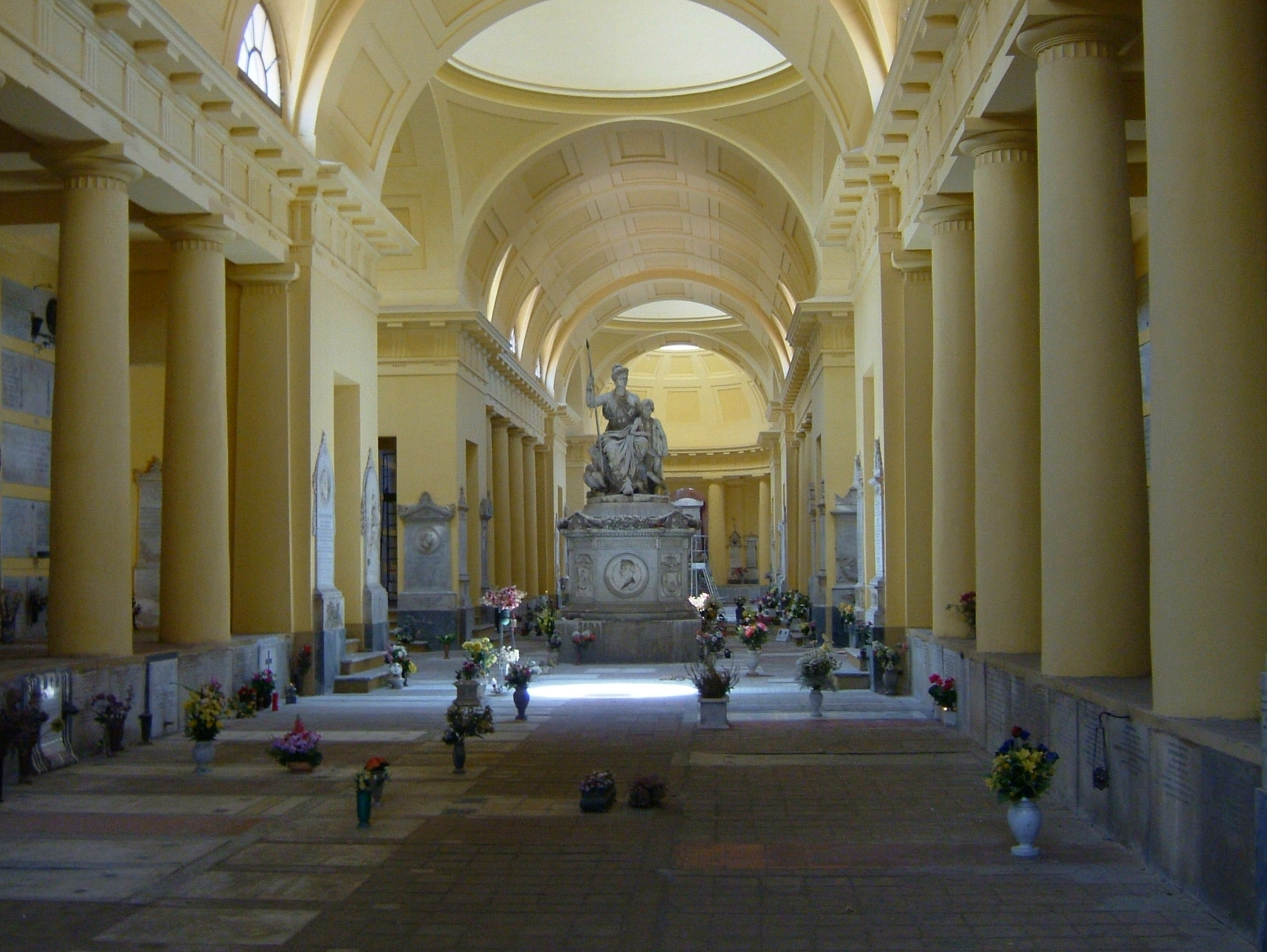
- Colombario's Hall at La Certosa of Bologni.
- Interactive map of Certosa of Bologna

Details
- Established: 1334
- Location: Bologna
- Country: Italy
- Type: Public
- Owned by: Bologna
- Website: Official website

The Certosa di Bologna is a former Carthusian monastery (or charterhouse) in Bologna, northern Italy, which was founded in 1334 and suppressed in 1797. In 1801 it became the city's Monumental Cemetery which would be much praised by Byron and others. In 1869 an Etruscan necropolis, which had been in use from the sixth to the third centuries BC, was discovered here.

The Certosa is located just outside the walls of the city, near the Stadio Renato Dall'Ara, at the foot of the Monte della Guardia and the Sanctuary of the Madonna di San Luca.

== The church ==
The church is dedicated to Saint Jerome (San Girolamo). The painting over the high altar is The Crucifixion by Bartolomeo Cesi; to the left is a Prayer in the Garden of Gethsemane and to the right a Deposition, also by Cesi. The wooden inlaid choir stalls were restored by Biagio De' Marchi in 1538 after a fire started by the Landsknechts of Charles V, Holy Roman Emperor. There is a series of large (450 x 350 cm) paintings of episodes from the life of Christ which were commissioned to Giovanni Andrea Sirani (Christ in the House of Simon, 1652), Elisabetta Sirani (The Baptism of Christ, 1658), Francesco Gessi (The Miraculous Draught of Fishes and The Expulsion from the Temple, 1645), Giovanni Maria Galli da Bibiena (The Ascension, 1651), Lorenzo Pasinelli (Entry into Jerusalem, 1657), Domenico Maria Canuti, and the Neapolitan Nunzio Rossi (Adoration of the Shepherds). There are paintings of several Carthusian martyrs including the Englishmen Blessed William Exmew, Blessed Thomas Johnson, Blessed Richard Bere, and Blessed Thomas Green.

Other works by Antonio and Bartolomeo Vivarini, Ludovico and Agostino Carracci, in addition to Guercino, were taken to Paris by Napoleon, and when returned to Bologna were deposited in the Pinacoteca Nazionale.

== The cemetery ==
The public cemetery was established in 1801 using the pre-existing structure of the Certosa di San Girolamo di Casara, founded in the middle of the 14th century that was closed by Napoleon in 1797. The passion of the local nobility and aristocracy for monumental family tombs transformed the Certosa in an "open-air museum," a stage of the Italian grand tour: it was visited by Byron, Dickens, Theodor Mommsen, and Stendhal. In particular the third cloister (or that of the chapel) is noteworthy: a tour of neoclassicism-inspired structures with symbology from the Age of Enlightenment. Some tombs are painted in tempera, others are made of stucco and scagliola.

An aspect that distinguishes the Certosa of Bologna from other monumental cemeteries of Europe is derived from the complex articulation of its use of space. To the original convent nucleus were added lodges, rooms, and porticos that recreate glimpses of a setting that recalls the city of the "living". Even the porticoed eastern entrance of the cemetery, which is linked to the one that leads to the Sanctuary of San Luca with only a small break, creates continuity between necropolis and city.

The discoveries from an Etruscan necropolis during archeological excavations organized by the engineer Antonio Zannoni, in order to extend the cemetery at the end of the 19th century, are now in the Civic Archeological Museum of Bologna.

== Tombs ==
Among those buried in the Certosa are the following:

- Farinelli (1705–1782), singer
- Gaetano Gandolfi (1734–1802), painter
- Mauro Gandolfi (1764–1834), painter
- Giuseppina Gargano (1853–1939), opera singer
- Giuseppe Grabinski (1771–1843), Polish military officer
- Maria Dalle Donne (1778–1842), pioneer woman physician and professor of obstetrics
- Isabella Colbran (1785–1845), singer and wife of Gioacchino Rossini
- Letizia Murat (1802–1859), daughter of Joachim Murat
- Giuseppe Ferlini (1797–1870), adventurer and archaeologist
- Gioacchino Napoleone Pepoli (1825–1881), Italian senator
- Nicola Zanichelli (1819–1884), publisher
- Marco Minghetti (1818–1886), Italian prime minister
- Severino Ferrari (1856–1905), poet
- Giosuè Carducci (1835–1907), poet
- Alfieri Maserati (1887–1932), car manufacturer
- Ottorino Respighi (1879–1936), composer
- Aldo Oviglio (1873–1942), first Minister of Justice of the Mussolini government
- Edoardo Weber (1889–1945), engineer
- Assunta Viscardi (1890–1947), school teacher in the process of beatification
- Riccardo Stracciari (1875–1955), singer
- Giorgio Morandi (1890–1964), painter
- Bruno Saetti (1902–1984), painter
- Riccardo Bacchelli (1891–1985), novelist
- Farpi Vignoli (1907–1997), sculptor
- Lucio Dalla (1943–2012), singer

== See also ==
- Monumental Cemetery of Staglieno
- Cimitero Monumentale di Milano
