= Institution des Chartreux =

Coordinates: 45°46′17″N 4°49′18″E

The Institution des Chartreux or more commonly Les Chartreux is a private Roman Catholic Carthusian educational establishment under a "contract of association" to the French state school system. The main site of the school is located in the 1st arrondissement of Lyon, on the hill of La Croix-Rousse.

The school was created and directed by priests from the St Iréné society, Father Jean-Bernard Plessy being the current director.

The school was started in 1825. It was then largely developed by Mr Hyvrier, who is now considered as the real creator of the school. After World War II, the school counted 300 pupils (boys only) and 20 professors. Nowadays, the school employs nearly 200 academic staff, with another 100 technical and administrative support posts, to serve some 2600 pupils at all levels from ages 2 to 22. The school also has a boarding house that counts approximately 300 students.
