= William of Fenoli =

William of Fenoli (died circa 1205) was a monk of the Carthusian Order, who lived in the late 12th - early 13th Century. He was a lay-brother at the Charterhouse of Casularum in Lombardy, where he managed the monastery's external affairs.

According to Carthusian annals, "He was untutored in theology, in philosophy and in worldly knowledge, but in spiritual life and good works he was most learned. His holiness was made known by very many miracles both during his life and after his death". For this, and accounts of other miracles performed at his intercession, William of Fenoli was beatified by Pope Pius IX, who approved his cultus (limited, local veneration) in 1860.

He is chiefly known for the following miracle. One day, when he was returning from his field work, he was set upon by robbers and defended himself by tearing the leg off his donkey, using this as a cudgel to drive off his attackers. Afterwards, he miraculously healed the donkey, restoring its leg. Blessed William is therefore often depicted in iconography with his donkey, brandishing the donkey's leg.

His feast day falls on 19 December, according to the Roman calendar, but on 16 December in the Carthusian calendar.
