= John Haile =

English priest and martyr

Blessed John Haile

Martyr
- Died: 4 May 1535; Tyburn, London, England
- Venerated in: Catholic Church
- Beatified: 29 December 1886, Rome by Pope Leo XIII
- Feast: 4 May

John Haile was an elderly secular priest who was vicar of Isleworth Middlesex in the early 16th century; his significance in history, like that of many of the English martyrs, begins only with the events which led to his death.

== Life ==
He was a fellow of Kings Hall, Cambridge, and is said to have lived an edifying life. He held the benefice of Chelmsford in Essex before his promotion to Isleworth on 13 August 1521. He was arrested in March 1535 by King Henry VIII's men and accused of the crime of treason for speaking against the King's divorce and remarriage. The information was laid by another priest, Fern of Teddington who was also convicted of treason, but received a pardon. John Haile was executed at Tyburn on 4 May 1535, together with the first Carthusian Martyrs of London and the Bridgettine priest Richard Reynolds, the confessor of nearby Syon Abbey. He was the first secular priest to suffer for the Catholic Faith under King Henry VIII and be recognised as a martyr and he was beatified on 29 December 1886 by Pope Leo XIII with 53 others.

== Sources ==
- Tyburn Convent. The one hundred and five martyrs of Tyburn
- Parish priests among the saints; canonized or beatified parish priests. Walter Gumbley, Freeport, N.Y., Books for Libraries Press, 1971, London, Burns & Oates (1917) pp39-40
