= Mabel Brigge =

Mabel Brigge (died 1538) was a widow from Yorkshire, England, who was executed for treason. Her crime was for having a black fast, fasting with the intention of causing death to the king, Henry VIII and Thomas Howard, 3rd Duke of Norfolk.

== Early life ==
Mabel Brigge was born in approximately 1506. She worked as a servant in a number of households, including for William Fisher of Wellwick, who claimed she fasted regularly and dismissed her under suspicion of theft. She worked for Nelson at Rysome Garth, who referred her to the household of John Lokkar, Reysome Grange in Holmpton, East Riding of Yorkshire, where she arrived with two children and a note that Nelson would pay for her costs.

== Trial ==
In summer 1537, Brigge was hired by Isobel Buck, a woman who also lived the town, to perform a black fast, also known as a St. Trinian's fast. The black fast took the form of three days of fasting, with no meat or milk allowed to be consumed, designed to focus the mind on prayer in favour of a specific saint towards an end goal. Brigge carried out the fast on the Friday, Saturday and Sunday around Lammas in 1537, telling the Lokkars that it was a "charitable fast".

Buck offered Brigge a peck of wheat and half a yard of linen to perform the fast, supposedly to help recover some money that Buck had lost. The fast was sanctioned by the local chantry priest, Sir Thomas Marshall, allowing Brigge to perform the fast for Buck as Buck was too weak to carry it out herself after a recent miscarriage.

In January 1538, Lokkar and his wife, Agnes, claimed that Brigge was actually carrying out the fast with the intent to kill King Henry VIII and the Duke of Norfolk, ejecting Brigge from their household and alerting the authorities. Agnes Lokkar also stated that Brigge claimed that she had attempted a similar fast in the past in order to kill a man, who had subsequently broken his neck. Brigge would go on to say that Lokkar had offered her money to back up this version of events, to the detriment of the Bucks.

Sir Ralph Ellerker led the investigation, and on 11 March 1538 took all parties to York for trial. Brigge and Buck were both found guilty, but Buck was subsequently reprieved. Buck's husband William and his father were also found guilty of attempting pervert the course of the investigation through bribery.

Mabel Brigge was executed at York on 7 April 1538 for her crimes.
