= Carthusian Martyrs =

Carthusian monks who were killed in the Reformation

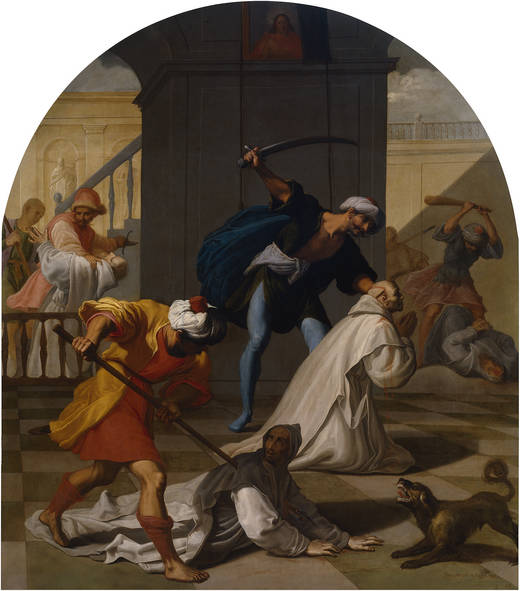
"Martirio de los cartujos de Mauerbach" (Martyrdom of the Mauerbach Carthusians) Vicente Carducho. 1642

The Carthusian martyrs are those members of the Carthusian monastic order who have been persecuted and killed because of their Christian faith and their adherence to the Catholic religion. As an enclosed order the Carthusians do not, on principle, put forward causes for their members, though causes have been promoted by others on their behalf.

== The order ==
The Carthusian order was founded in 1084 by Saint Bruno of Cologne, and is an eremitic order, holding to the principle of withdrawal from the world to a life of silent contemplation and prayer. They are often viewed as hermits that live in common, having no active apostolate outside their Charterhouse. Carthusian life is dramatically different as compared to Benedictine Monasticism, the most prevalent form in the west. Today the Carthusians are a small order comprising 25 houses worldwide with just 350 male and 75 female members.

== The Martyrs ==
During the Hussite Revolution in Bohemia in the 15th century Carthusian houses, as with other Catholic institutions, came under attack. In 1419 the charterhouse in Prague was burned down.

Dom Andreas, prior of Žiče Charterhouse, was captured during an Ottoman raid and martyred on March 3, 1529. The Mauerbach Charterhouse on the outskirts of Vienna, Austria, was plundered and set on fire by Ottoman troops during the 1529 Siege of Vienna, and was again targeted by the Ottomans during the 1683 Battle of Vienna, though there seems no precise record of the names of monks killed in either assault.

In 1537 during the English Reformation the London Charterhouse was dissolved and its members imprisoned and later executed. Eighteen of these, the Carthusian Martyrs of London, were beatified in 1886 by Pope Leo XIII; three of these (Augustine Webster, John Houghton and Robert Lawrence) were canonized in 1970 by Pope Paul VI with other English martyrs as the Forty Martyrs of England and Wales.

In 1572 during the Dutch Revolt the Charterhouses of Delft and Roermond were attacked, resulting in the deaths of Dom Justus van Schoonhoven and at least two others.

During the French Revolution numerous Carthusians were persecuted with other Catholic religious and lay persons. Claude Beguignot and Lazarus Tiersot were ordained Carthusians. As priests, they were required to take the anti-Papal oath of the "Civil Constitution of the Clergy". At their refusal they were imprisoned along with eight other Carthusians in former slave ships anchored in the Charente River at Rochefort. Like most of 800 priests and clergy confined there, they died in 1794 due to the inhumane conditions. They were beatified by Pope John Paul II in 1995.

In 1936, during the Spanish Civil War, Carthusians were affected by the widespread anti-clericalism; two of these, from the Charterhouse of Montalegre, have so far been recognized.

In September 1944, monks from the charterhouse at Certosa di Farneta opened their doors to troops from the 16th SS Panzergrenadier Division, who said they came bearing gifts for the abbey. They broke into the monastery to arrest 32 partisans and Jews being sheltered in the monastery. Some of the refugees were able to escape. Of the more than sixty killed, twelve were Carthusians. Among the twelve Carthusians killed were two Germans, one Swiss, one Venezuelan, and one Spaniard. The remaining monks were also from diverse countries. Those killed were:

- Benedetto Lapuente
- Bruno D'Amico
- Raffaele Cantero
- Adriano Compagnon
- Adriano Clerc
- Michele Nota
- Giorgio Maritano
- Pio Egger
- Martino Binz
- Gabriele Maria Costa
- Bernardo Montes de Oca
- Aldo Mei
