= John Houghton (martyr) =

English Carthusian hermit and Catholic martyr

Saint John Houghton OCart
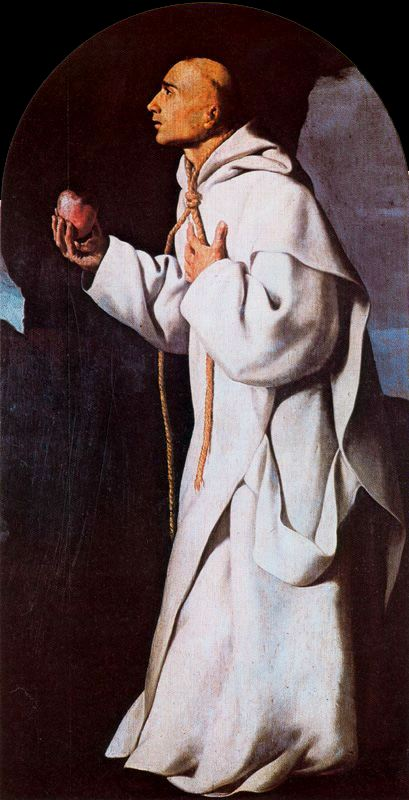
- Blessed John Houghton, by Francisco Zurbarán

Martyr
- Born: c. 1487; Essex, England
- Died: 4 May 1535 (aged 47–48); Tyburn, London, England
- Venerated in: Roman Catholic Church
- Beatified: 29 December 1886 by Pope Leo XIII
- Canonized: 25 October 1970 by Pope Paul VI
- Feast: 4 May 25 October
- Attributes: Carthusian habit, noose in neck, heart in hand, knife, book, martyr's palm

John Houghton, OCart (c. 1486 – 4 May 1535) was a Catholic priest of the Carthusian order and the first martyr to die as a result of the Act of Supremacy by King Henry VIII of England. He was also the first of the Carthusians to die as a martyr. As one of the Carthusian Martyrs of London he is among the Forty Martyrs of England and Wales.

== Early life ==
Born around 1487, Houghton was (according to one of his fellow Carthusians) educated at Cambridge, but cannot be identified among surviving records. Similarly, no certain records can be found of his ordination.

It is said that he escaped an arranged marriage as soon as he completed his education and took refuge with a devout priest.

== Monastic life ==
He entered the London Charterhouse in 1516, was appointed sacristan in 1523, and in 1528 procurator, the monastery's business manager. In 1531, he became prior of the Charterhouse of Beavale in Nottinghamshire. However, in November of that same year, he was elected prior of the London house, to which he returned. In addition, the following spring he was named Provincial Visitor, at the head of the English Carthusians.

In April 1534, two royal agents visited the Charterhouse. Houghton advised them that "it pertained not to his vocation and calling nor to that of his subjects to meddle in or discuss the king's business, neither could they or ought they to do so, and that it did not concern him who the king wished to divorce or marry, so long as he was not asked for any opinion." He asked that he and his community be exempted from the oath required under the new Act of Succession, which resulted in both him and his procurator, Humphrey Middlemore, being arrested and taken to the Tower of London. However, by the end of May, they had been persuaded that the oath was consistent with the Catholic faith if they added the clause "as far as the law of Christ allows" and they returned to the Charterhouse, where (in the presence of a large armed force) the whole community took the required oath.

== Arrest and execution ==
However, in 1535, the community was called upon to make the new oath as prescribed by the 1534 Act of Supremacy, which recognised Henry as the Supreme Head of the Church of England. Again, Houghton, this time accompanied by the heads of the other two English Carthusian houses (Robert Lawrence, prior of Beauvale, and Augustine Webster, prior of Axholme), pleaded for an exemption, but this time they were summarily arrested. They were called before a special commission in April 1535, and sentenced to death, along with Richard Reynolds, a monk from Syon Abbey.

Houghton, along with the other two Carthusians, Reynolds and John Haile of Isleworth, was hanged, drawn and quartered at Tyburn on 4 May 1535.

The three priors were taken to Tyburn in their religious habits and were not previously laicised from the priesthood and religious state as was the custom of the day. From his prison cell in the Tower, Thomas More saw the three Carthusian priors being dragged to Tyburn on hurdles and exclaimed to his daughter: "Look, Meg! These blessed Fathers be now as cheerfully going to their deaths as bridegrooms to their marriage!" John Houghton was the first to be executed. After he was hanged, he was taken down alive, and the process of quartering him began.

Catholic tradition relates that when Houghton was about to be quartered, as the executioner tore open his chest to remove his heart, he prayed, "O Jesus, what wouldst thou do with my heart?". His companions were butchered next. After his death, his body was chopped to pieces and hung in different parts of London.

== Legacy ==
He was beatified on 29 December 1886 by Pope Leo XIII and canonized on 25 October 1970 by Pope Paul VI.

There is a mosaic of Houghton in the Holy Name of Jesus Roman Catholic Church, Oxford Road, Chorlton-on-Medlock, Manchester.

A painting of the Carthusian protomartyr by the noted painter Francisco Zurbarán, depicts him with his heart in his hand and a noose around his neck.

In the chapter house of St. Hugh's Charterhouse in England, there is a painting depicting the martyrdom of the three priors.

There are stained glass windows of Saint John Houghton in the following churches:

- St. Dominic's Priory Church in London
- Our Lady and the English Martyrs in Cambridge
- Belmont Abbey outside Hereford
- St. Mark's Church in Mansfield
- Shrewsbury Cathedral, he is next to Thomas More in the fifth window.

St John Houghton Catholic Voluntary Academy is named in his honor.

== See also ==
- Carthusian Martyrs

== Sources ==
- Oxford Dictionary of National Biography (2006)
- L. Hendriks, The London Charterhouse: its monks and its martyrs (1889)
- "Bl. Humphrey Middlemore". Catholic Encyclopedia.
- Media related to John Houghton (martyr) at Wikimedia Commons
