= Beauvale Priory =

Carthusian monastery in Beauvale, Nottinghamshire

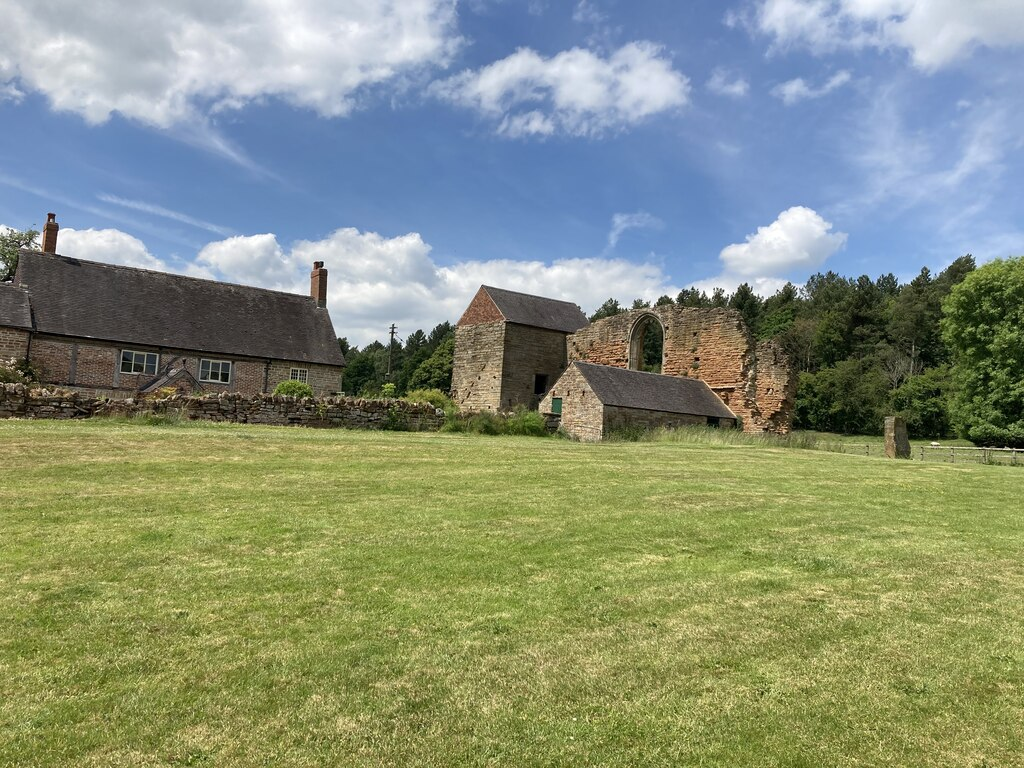
- The priory in 2022

- Location within Nottinghamshire
- Interactive map of Beauvale Priory

Monastery information
- Full name: The Priory Church of the Holy Trinity, Beauvale
- Other name: Beauvale Charterhouse
- Order: Carthusian
- Established: 1343
- Disestablished: 1539
- Dedication: Holy Trinity

People
- Founders: Nicholas de Cantiloup, Lord of Ilkeston

Site
- Location: Beauvale, Nottinghamshire, England
- Coordinates: 53.036424°N 1.267206°W
- Public access: yes
- Other information

Scheduled monument
- Official name: Beauvale Carthusian Priory
- Designated: 10 April 1915
- Reference no.: 1002920
- Website: https://www.beauvalepriory.com/

Beauvale Priory (also known as Beauvale Charterhouse) was a Carthusian monastery in Beauvale, Nottinghamshire.

== History ==
The priory was founded in 1343 by Nicholas de Cantelupe (d.1355), in honour of the Blessed Trinity. The priory was originally built to be home to a prior and twelve monks. It was the third of nine houses of the Carthusian order established in England. The two earlier houses were established in Witham Friary and Hinton in Somerset. The others were London Charterhouse, St. Anne's near Coventry, Kingston upon Hull and Mount Grace in Yorkshire, Epworth and Shene. The Valor Ecclesiasticus of 1534 lists the priory as having an annual income of £227 8s., of which £196 6s. was left after expenses. At this time the priory was in control of the advowsons of the churches of Greasley and Selston in Nottinghamshire; Bonby in Lincolnshire; and Farnham in Yorkshire.

== Role in late-medieval English mysticism ==
Although concrete evidence remains scant, several claims have been made for Beauvale's role in shaping late medieval English spirituality: John P.H. Clark suggests that the author of the seminal mystical text The Cloud of Unknowing was probably a Carthusian of Beauvale Priory. and Jonathan Hughes posits that Beauvale may have been an important centre for the study of English mystic Richard Rolle.

== Dissolution and martyrdom ==
Following England’s break from Rome, the Carthusians refused to accept King Henry VIII's supremacy over the church. Robert Lawrence, Prior of Beauvale, travelled to London in 1535 to see Thomas Cromwell in person in the hope of stopping the dissolution of his priory. Cromwell never saw Lawrence and he, along with two other Carthusian Priors who had made similar journeys, were imprisoned in the Tower of London as traitors. One of these was John Houghton, Lawrence's predecessor as Prior at Beauvale. Prior Lawrence was interrogated on 20 April but declared he could "not take our sovereign lord to be supreme head of the Church, but him that is by God the head of the Church, that is the bishop of Rome, as Ambrose, Jerome, and Augustine teach". The three Carthusians and a Brigittine monk from Syon Abbey were all tried on 28 April and charged with "verbal treason" for claiming King Henry was not the supreme head of the Church of England. The jury refused to find the four guilty as they felt "they did not act maliciously"; Cromwell, however, violently threatened the jury until they returned a guilty verdict.

Prior Lawrence became one of a group known as the Carthusian Martyrs. He and his fellow prisoners were sentenced to death (to be hanged, drawn and quartered) and returned to the Tower until 4 May when they were taken to Tyburn for execution. The execution was made deliberately more "ghastly and revolting" to show the King's power and deter others. Prior Lawrence was executed wearing his monk's habit. The rope used to hang him was larger than usual to avoid fatally strangling him; thus ensuring he was still alive when he was butchered and mutilated, before finally being "quartered" (chopped into 4 pieces).

Lawrence was created a saint by Pope Paul VI in 1970 as one of the Forty Martyrs of England and Wales.

The annual value of this monastery was just under £200, the limit for the suppression of the lesser monasteries; but by paying the heavy fine of £166 13s. 4d. the monks were able to postpone dissolution. This bargain was effected on 2 January 1537/38.

Beauvale Priory was finally surrendered for dissolution on 18 July 1539. The surrender document was signed by the Prior, Thomas Woodcock, and seven other monks: John Langdale, William Welles, Alexander Lowthe, Edmund Garner, Robert Gowton (proctor), Thomas Leyghton, and Thomas Wallis. Prior Woodcock was awarded an annual pension of £26 13s. 4d. The priory and most of its possessions were granted in 1541 to Sir William Huse of London. The manor of Etwall, previously held by the priory, was granted to Sir John Porte in 1540.

== List of priors ==
- William, occurs 1404
- Richard de Burton, occurs 1422, 1426
- Thomas Metheley, occurs 1468
- John Swift, occurs 1478
- Thomas Wydder, occurs 1482
- Nicholas Wartre, occurs 1486
- John Houghton 1531.
- Robert Lawrence, executed 1535.
- Thomas Woodcock, 16 December 1537 – surrender 1539

== Remains ==
Some tiles and fragments of stained glass are now in St. Mary's Church, Greasley. Two manuscripts associated with the library at Beauvale are also extant: Cambridge MS Mm 5.37, a copy of Richard Rolle's Incendium Amoris, and Bodleian Library MS Douce 114, a collection of Middle English translations of the vitae of Elizabeth of Spalbeek, Marie of Oignies, and Christina the Astonishing, a letter concerning Catherine of Siena, and Henry Suso's Horologium Sapientiae.

There are still substantial remains of the buildings, and the whole site has been designated as a scheduled ancient monument, because of the range of features that survive, and their rarity value, for Beauvale was one of only nine Carthusian houses to be built in England. The monks were well respected, because they maintained their austere standards until the Dissolution. The site was one of the first to receive scheduled monument protection, on 10 April 1915, and the individual buildings were granted listed building status in 1952. The remains of the Priory Church are Grade II* listed, while the Gatehouse and parts of the boundary wall are separately listed as Grade II buildings. The site also includes the Abbey Farmhouse, which was built in the 16th century and extended in the 18th and 19th centuries, using material which was largely quarried from the priory.

== In literature ==
The ruin of Beauvale Priory was the setting for D.H. Lawrence's historical short story, "A Fragment of Stained Glass."

== See also ==
- Carthusian Martyrs
- Grade II* listed buildings in Nottinghamshire
- Listed buildings in Greasley
