= Forty Martyrs of England and Wales =

Catholics martyred during the Reformation

Forty Martyrs of England and Wales "Cuthbert Mayne and Thirty-Nine Companion Martyrs"
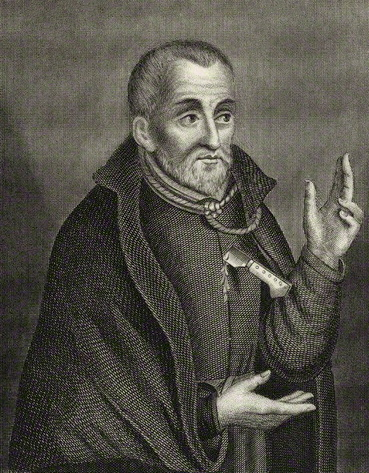
- Edmund Campion, one of the martyrs
- Died: between 4 May 1535 (John Houghton and three companions) – 27 August 1679 (David Lewis), within England and Wales, many at Tyburn
- Martyred by: Monarchy of England
- Means of martyrdom: Two died in prison, one was pressed to death, the rest were hanged, drawn and quartered
- Venerated in: Catholic Church; 3 were also honored in the Anglican Communion
- Beatified: 11 were beatified on 29 December 1886 by Pope Leo XIII; 29 were beatified on 15 December 1929 by Pope Pius XI
- Canonized: 25 October 1970, Saint Peter's Basilica, Vatican City, by Pope Paul VI
- Feast: 4 May (England); 25 October (Wales); Various dates for individual martyrs
- Attributes: Martyr's palm Knife in chest Noose in neck Book or Bible; Crucifix; Chaucible; Eucharist; Various religious habits Crown of martyrdom
- Patronage: United Kingdom
- Notable martyrs: Edmund Campion, S.J. Margaret Clitherow

The Forty Martyrs of England and Wales or Cuthbert Mayne and Thirty-Nine Companion Martyrs are a group of Catholic, lay and religious, men and women, executed between 1535 and 1679 for treason and related offences under various laws enacted by Parliament during the English Reformation. The individuals listed range from Carthusian monks who in 1535 declined to accept Henry VIII's Act of Supremacy, to seminary priests who were caught up in the alleged Popish Plot against Charles II in 1679. Many were sentenced to death at show trials, or with no trial at all.

== Background ==
The first wave of executions came with the reign of King Henry VIII and involved persons who did not support the 1534 Act of Supremacy and dissolution of the monasteries. Carthusian John Houghton and Bridgettine Richard Reynolds died at this time.

In 1570 Pope Pius V, in support of various rebellions in England and Ireland, excommunicated Queen Elizabeth, absolving her Catholic subjects of their allegiance to her. The Crown responded with more rigorous enforcement of various penal laws already enacted and passed new ones. The Treason Act 1571 made it high treason to affirm that the queen ought not to enjoy the Crown, or to declare her to be a heretic. The Jesuits, etc. Act 1584, the statute under which most of the English martyrs suffered, made it high treason for any Jesuit or any seminary priest to be in England at all, and a felony for any person to harbour or aid them. All but six of the forty had been hanged, drawn and quartered, many of them at Tyburn.

== The martyrs ==
- Saint John Almond
- Saint Edmund Arrowsmith, S.J.
- Saint Ambrose Barlow, O.S.B.
- Saint John Boste
- Saint Alexander Briant, S.J.
- Saint Edmund Campion, S.J.
- Saint Margaret Clitherow
- Saint Philip Evans, S.J.
- Saint Thomas Garnet, S.J.
- Saint Edmund Gennings
- Saint Richard Gwyn
- Saint John Houghton, O.Cart.
- Saint Philip Howard
- Saint John Jones, O.F.M.
- Saint John Kemble
- Saint Luke Kirby
- Saint Robert Lawrence, O.Cart.
- Saint David Lewis, S.J.
- Saint Anne Line
- Saint John Lloyd
- Saint Cuthbert Mayne
- Saint Henry Morse, S.J.
- Saint Nicholas Owen, S.J.
- Saint John Payne
- Saint Polydore Plasden
- Saint John Plessington
- Saint Richard Reynolds, O.Ss.S.
- Saint John Rigby
- Saint John Roberts, O.S.B.
- Saint Alban Roe, O.S.B.
- Saint Ralph Sherwin
- Saint Robert Southwell, S.J.
- Saint John Southworth
- Saint John Stone, O.E.S.A.
- Saint John Wall, O.F.M.
- Saint Henry Walpole, S.J.
- Saint Margaret Ward
- Saint Augustine Webster, O.Cart.
- Saint Swithun Wells
- Saint Eustace White

== Canonization process ==
Following beatifications between 1886 and 1929, there were already numerous martyrs from England and Wales recognised with the rank of Blessed. The bishops of the province identified a list of 40 further names; reasons given for the choice of those particular names include a spread of social status, religious rank, geographical spread and the pre-existence of popular devotion. The list of names was submitted to Rome in December 1960. In the case of a martyr, a miracle is not required. For a martyr, the Pope has only to make a declaration of martyrdom, which is a certification that the Venerable died voluntarily as a witness of the Catholic faith or in an act of heroic charity for others.

The Archbishop of Westminster, then Cardinal William Godfrey, sent a description of 24 seemingly miraculous cases to the Sacred Congregation. Out of 20 candidate cases for recognition as answered prayers, the alleged cure of a young mother from a malignant tumour was selected as the clearest case. In light of the fact that Thomas More and John Fisher, belonging to the same group of Martyrs, had been canonized with a dispensation from miracles, Pope Paul VI, after discussions with the Sacred Congregation for the Causes of Saints, considered that it was possible to proceed with the canonization on the basis of one miracle.

Pope Paul VI granted permission for the whole group of 40 names to be recognised as saints on the strength of this one miracle. The canonization ceremony took place in Rome on 25 October 1970.

== Liturgical feast day ==
In England, these martyrs were formerly commemorated within the Catholic Church by a feast day on 25 October, which is also the feast of Saints Crispin and Crispinian, but they are now celebrated together with all the 284 canonized or beatified martyrs of the English Reformation on 4 May.

In Wales, the Catholic Church keeps 25 October as the feast of the Six Welsh Martyrs and their companions. The Welsh Martyrs are the priests Philip Evans and John Lloyd, John Jones, David Lewis, John Roberts, and the teacher Richard Gwyn. The companions are the 34 English Martyrs listed above. Wales continues to keep 4 May as a separate feast for the beatified martyrs of England and Wales.

== See also ==
- Saint Thomas More
- Saint John Fisher
- List of Catholic martyrs of the English Reformation
- English Saints and Martyrs of the Reformation Era, a Church of England commemoration-day for all martyrs of the English Reformation era
- Catholic Church in England and Wales
- Eighty-five martyrs of England and Wales, a list of eighty-five beatified by the Pope to represent those executed during the English Reformation
- Carthusian Martyrs of London
- Irish Catholic Martyrs
