= Augustine Webster =

English Roman Catholic saint

Saint Augustine Webster O. Cart.
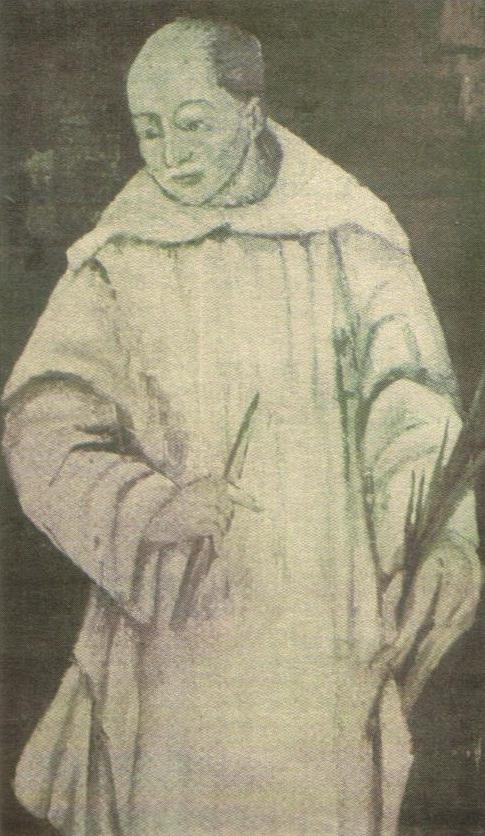

Carthusian Martyr
- Died: 4 May 1535; Tyburn, London, England
- Honored in: Roman Catholic Church
- Beatified: 29 December 1886 by Pope Leo XIII
- Canonized: 25 October 1970 by Pope Paul VI
- Feast: 4 May (individual); 25 October (collectively with Forty Martyrs of England and Wales)
- Attributes: martyr's palm, knife, Carthusian habit

Augustine Webster, O.Cart (died 4 May 1535) was an English Catholic martyr. He was the prior of Our Lady of Melwood, a Carthusian house at Epworth, on the Isle of Axholme, in north Lincolnshire, in 1531. His feast day is 4 May.

== Background ==
At the outbreak of the English Reformation, England had ten of these hermitage-monasteries. In English they are commonly called "Charterhouses", from the French name for the location of their first foundation, in the mountainous area of the "La Chartreuse". The Carthusians were held in the highest esteem. The government was at first anxious to secure the public acquiescence of the monks of the London Charterhouse regarding royal supremacy in ecclesiastical matters; since for the austerity and sincerity of their mode of life they enjoyed great prestige.

== Life ==
Augustine Webster was educated at Cambridge University, and became a monk at the Charterhouse of Sheen. In 1531, he became prior of Our Lady of Melwood, a Carthusian house at Epworth, on the Isle of Axholme.

In February 1535, he was on a visit to the London Charterhouse with his fellow prior, Robert Lawrence of Beauvale, to consult the prior of London, John Houghton about the approach to be taken by the Carthusians with regard to the religious policies of Henry VIII.

They resolved to go together to Cromwell, the King's Vicar-General, to represent their sincere loyalty, but to petition to be exempted from a requirement that would violate their conscience. Cromwell was unsympathetic.

== Trial ==
Sometime around the middle of April 1535, Webster, and fellow Carthusians, Houghton and Lawrence were imprisoned in the Tower on the orders of Thomas Cromwell for refusing to take the Oath of Supremacy.

They were soon joined by Bridgettine Richard Reynolds. All four were examined together and charged for their denial of the royal supremacy. The trial took place 28 April. They pleaded "not guilty" to the charge of treason and were led back to prison. The jury deliberated all day, and when Cromwell sent to inquire the cause of the delay, it was intimated that they would find the men innocent. Despite threats, the jury refused to return a guilty verdict until Cromwell appeared before them in person. All four were hanged, beheaded and quartered at Tyburn on 4 May 1535.

== Veneration ==
Augustine Webster was one of the Forty Martyrs of England and Wales canonized by Pope Paul VI.

There are stained-glass windows of the martyr in the following churches:

- Holy Souls Church in Scunthorpe, North Lincolnshire
- Our Lady and the English Martyrs, Hills Road, Cambridge
- St Etheldreda's Church in Ely Place
- St Mary's Roman Catholic Church, Bridge Gate, Derby
- Roman Catholic Parish of St. Mary and St. Augustine Webster, Barton-upon-Humber

St. Augustine Webster Catholic Voluntary Academy in North Lincolnshire is named after him.

Roman Catholic Parish of St. Mary and St. Augustine Webster is named after him.

== See also ==
- Forty Martyrs of England and Wales
- Carthusian Martyrs of London
- Carthusian Martyrs
