= Carthusians =

Roman Catholic religious order

Order of Carthusians
- Ordo Cartusiensis
- Formation: 15 August 1084; 942 years ago
- Founder: Bruno of Cologne
- Founded at: France
- Type: Monastic Order of Pontifical Right
- Headquarters: Grande Chartreuse (Mother House)
- Members: About 380
- Post-nominal letters: OCart
- Parent organization: Catholic Church
- Website: www.chartreux.org; www.vocatiochartreux.org

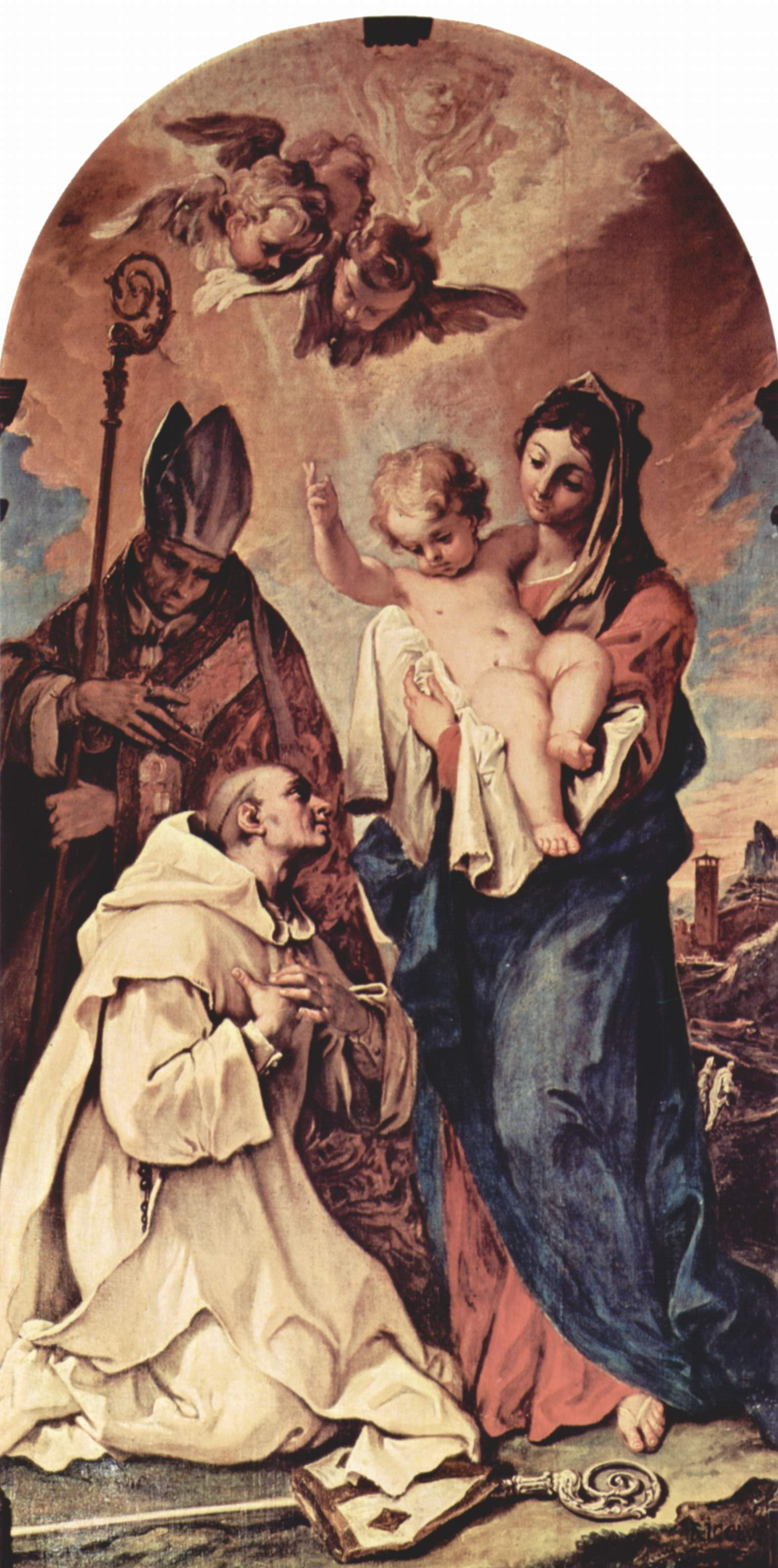
Painting by Sebastiano Ricci (1659–1734) depicting the founder of the Carthusians, Bruno of Cologne (c. 1030-1101), revering Mary, mother of Jesus and adoring the Christ Child, with Hugh of Lincoln (1135–1200) looking on in the background.

The Carthusians, also known as the Order of Carthusians (Latin: Ordo Cartusiensis), are an enclosed religious order of the Catholic Church. The order was founded by Bruno of Cologne in 1084 and includes both monks and nuns. The order has its own rule, called the Statutes, and their life combines both eremitical and cenobitic monasticism. The motto of the Carthusians is Stat crux dum volvitur orbis, Latin for "The Cross is steady while the world turns." The Carthusians retain a unique form of liturgy known as the Carthusian Rite.

The name Carthusian is derived from the Chartreuse Mountains in the French Prealps: Bruno built his first hermitage there in a valley. These names were adapted to the English charterhouse, meaning a Carthusian monastery. (Note: In other languages: Dutch: Kartuize; Kartuis; French: Chartreuse; German: Kartause; Italian: Certosa; Polish: Kartuzja; Spanish: Cartuja) Today, there are 23 charterhouses, 18 for monks and 5 for nuns. The alcoholic cordial Chartreuse has been produced by the monks of Grande Chartreuse since 1737, which gave rise to the name of the color.

== History ==
In 1084 Bishop Hugh of Grenoble offered Bruno, the former Chancellor of the Diocese of Reims, a solitary site in the mountains of his diocese, in the valley of Chartreuse. There Bruno and six companions built a hermitage, consisting of a few wooden cabins opening towards a gallery that allowed them access to the communal areas, the church, the refectory, and the chapter room without having to suffer too much from inclement conditions.

Six years later, Bruno's former pupil, Pope Urban II, requested his services. Bruno would only live in Rome for a few short months however, before leaving to establish a new hermitage in Serra San Bruno, in Calabria, a region of southern Italy. He died there on 6 October 1101.

In 1132, an avalanche destroyed the first hermitage, killing 7 monks under the snow. The fifth prior of Chartreuse, Guiges, rebuilt the hermitage.

The order was founded upon the Consuetudines. It contains largely the rule of the order. It was described by Trappist monk Thomas Merton as "every line of the Carthusian rule convinces the reader that the men who framed it knew precisely what they were looking for and had a very good notion of the best means of finding it."

=== Carthusians in Britain ===
There were ten Carthusian monasteries in Britain before the Reformation, with one in Scotland and nine in England. The first was founded by Henry II of England in 1181 at Witham Friary, Somerset as penance for the murder of Thomas Becket. Hugh of Lincoln was its first prior. The third Charterhouse built in Britain was Beauvale Priory, remains of which can still be seen in Beauvale, Greasley, Nottinghamshire.

The Carthusians, as with all Catholic religious orders, were variously persecuted and banned during the Reformation. The abolition of their priories, which were sources of charity in England, particularly reduced their numbers. This was followed by the French Revolution which had a similar effect in France.

The Charterhouse, Coventry has been conserved and was opened to the public in April 2023. The area, about a mile from the centre of the city, is a conservation area, and the buildings had been in use as part of a local college. Inside the building is a medieval wall painting, alongside many carvings and wooden beams. Nearby is the river Sherbourne which runs underneath the centre of the city.

The best preserved remains of a medieval Charterhouse in the UK are at Mount Grace Priory near Osmotherley, North Yorkshire. One of the cells has been reconstructed to illustrate how different the layout is from monasteries of most other Christian orders, which are normally designed with communal living in mind.

The London Charterhouse gave its name to Charterhouse Square and several streets in the City of London, as well as to the Charterhouse School which used part of its site before moving out to Godalming, Surrey.

Nothing remains at Hull or Sheen, although Hull Charterhouse is an almshouse that shared the site of the monastery. Axholme, Hinton, and Witham have slight remains.

Perth Charterhouse, the single Carthusian Priory founded in Scotland during the Middle Ages, was located in Perth. It stood just west of the medieval town and was founded by James I (1406–1437) in 1426. James I and Joan Beaufort, Queen of Scots (died 1445) were both buried in the priory church, as was Queen Margaret Tudor (died 1541), widow of James IV of Scotland. The Priory, said to have been a building of "wondrous cost and greatness", was sacked during the Scottish Reformation in 1559, and swiftly fell into decay. No remains survive above ground, though a Victorian monument marks the site. The Perth names Charterhouse Lane and Pomarium Flats (built on the site of the Priory's orchard) recall its existence.

There is an active Carthusian house in England, St Hugh's Charterhouse, Parkminster, West Sussex. This has cells around a square cloister approximately 400 metres (0.25 mi) on a side, making it the largest cloister in Europe. It was built in the 19th century to accommodate two communities which were expelled from the continent.

== Charterhouse ==
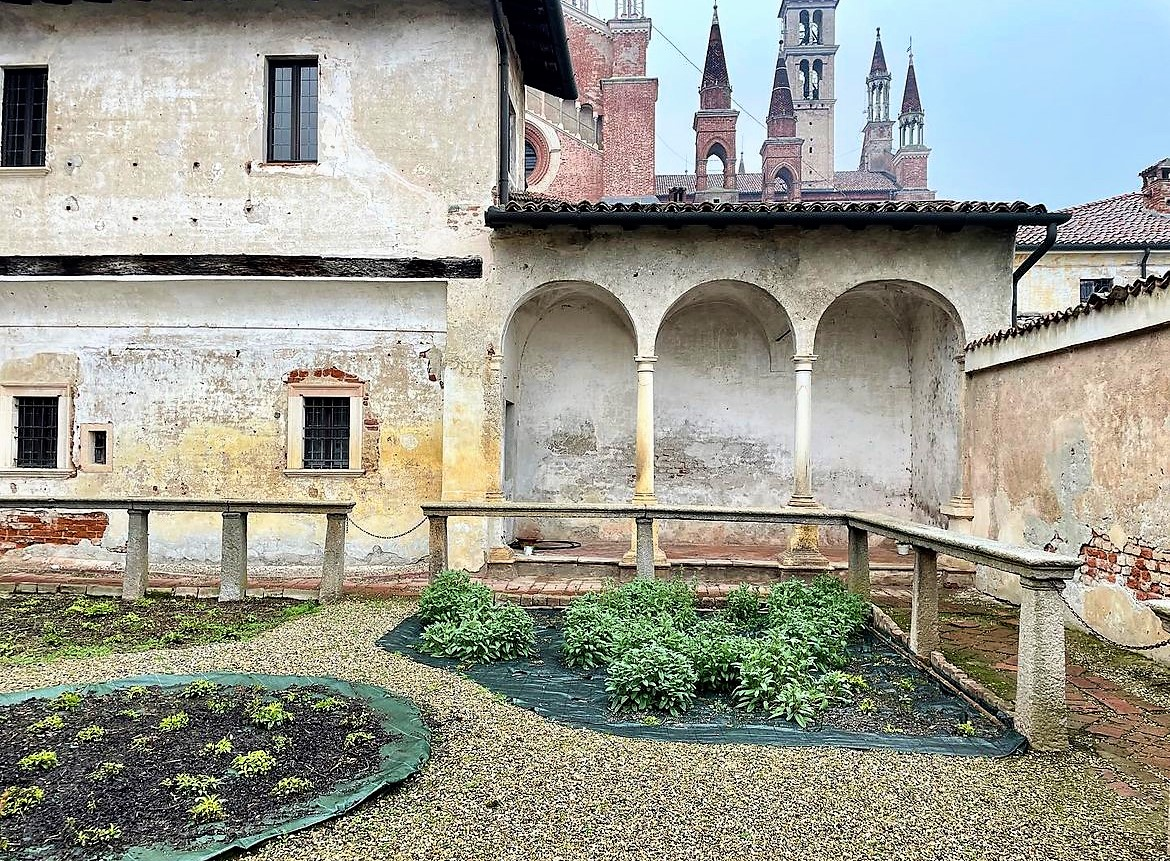
Garden of a cell at the Certosa di Pavia

The monastery is generally a small community of hermits based on the model of the 4th-century Lauras of Palestine. A Carthusian monastery consists of a number of individual "cells", usually small houses, each with a small garden, built around a cloister. The individual cells are typically organised so that the door of each cell comes off a large corridor or cloister inner wall.

The focus of Carthusian life is contemplation. To this end, there is an emphasis on solitude and silence. Carthusians do not have abbots—instead, each charterhouse is headed by a prior and is populated by two types of monks: the choir monks, referred to as hermits, and the lay brothers. This reflects a division of labor in providing for the material needs of the monastery and the monks. For the most part, the number of brothers in the Order has remained the same for centuries, as it is now: seven or eight brothers for every ten fathers. Humility is a characteristic of Carthusian spirituality. The Carthusian identity is one of shared solitude.

=== Musical practice ===
Similar to the tradition of the Byzantine Rite, Carthusians eschew the use of musical instruments in worship.

=== Choirmonks ===
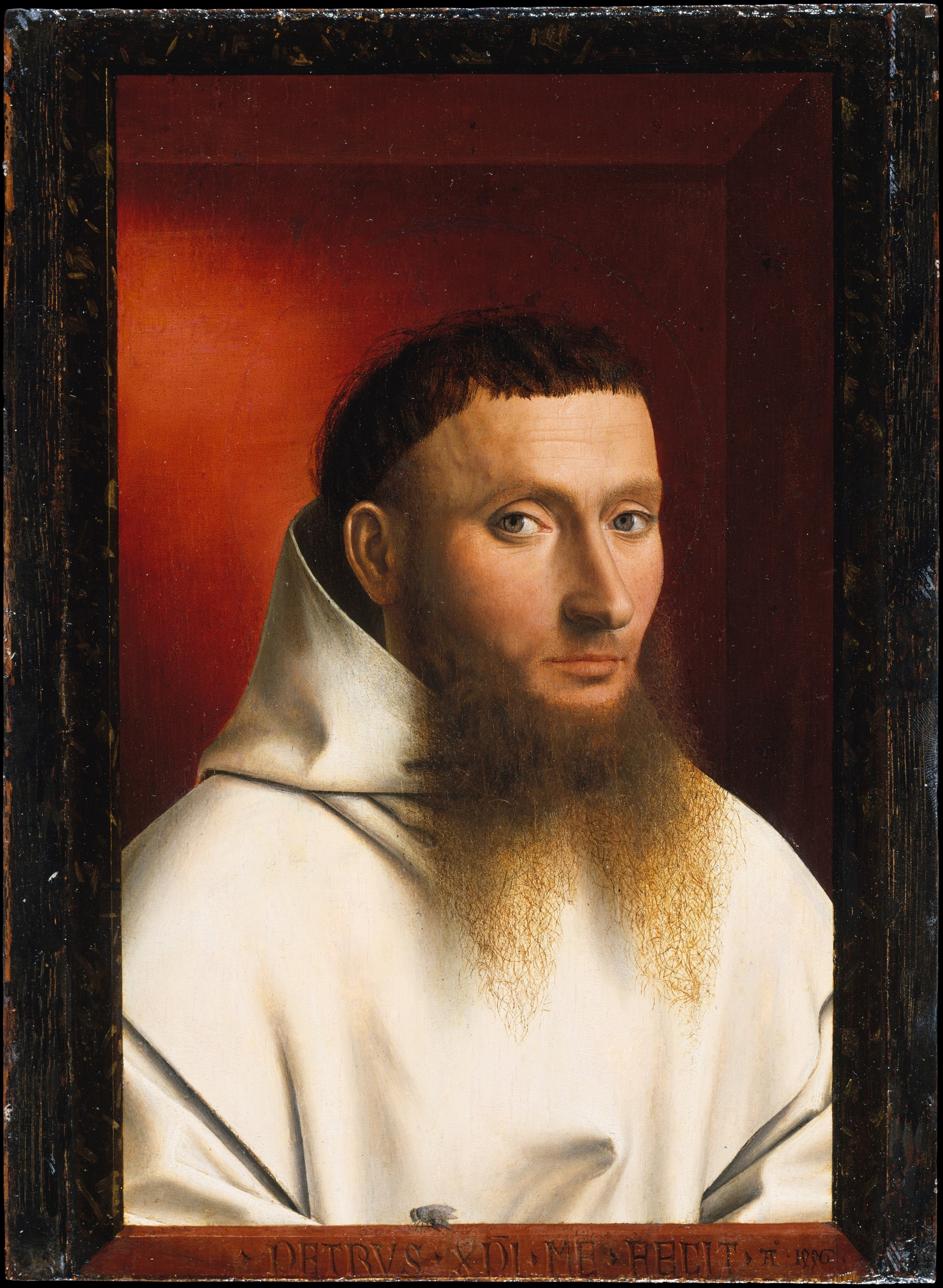
Carthusian monk depicted in Petrus Christus's painting Portrait of a Carthusian.

Each hermit, a monk who is or who will be a priest, has his own living space, called a cell, usually consisting of a small dwelling. Traditionally there is a one-room lower floor for the storage of wood for a stove and a workshop as all monks engage in some manual labour. A second floor consists of a small entryway with an image of the Virgin Mary as a place of prayer and a larger room containing a bed, a table for eating meals, a desk for study, a choir stall, and a kneeler for prayer. Each cell has a high-walled garden wherein the monk may meditate as well as grow flowers for himself and/or vegetables for the common good of the community, as a form of physical exercise.

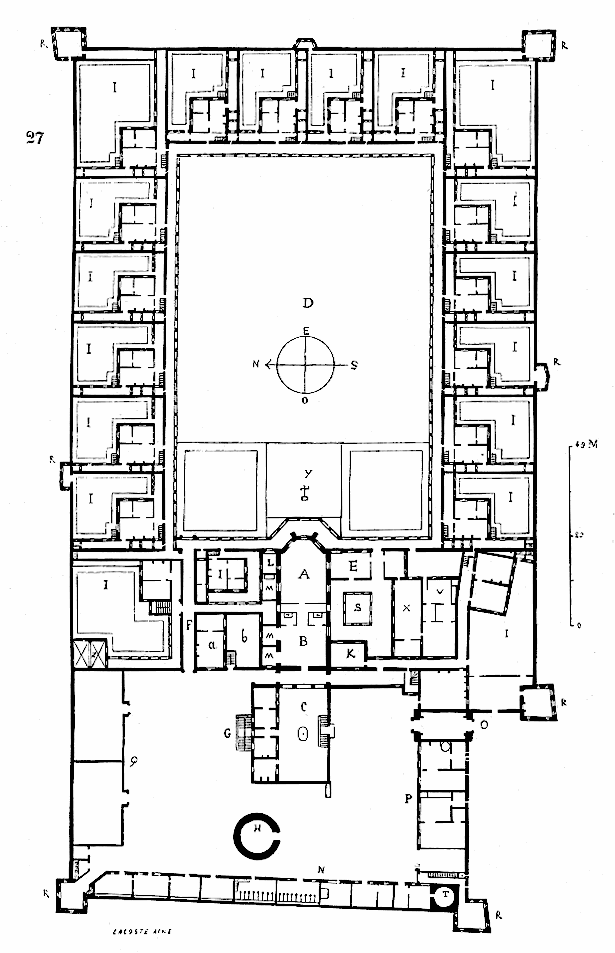
A typical Carthusian plan: Clermont, drawn by Eugène Viollet-le-Duc, 1856.

Next to the door is a small revolving compartment, called a "turn", so that meals and other items may be passed in and out of the cell without the hermit having to meet the bearer. Most meals are provided in this manner, which the hermit then eats in the solitude of his cell. There are two meals provided for much of the year: lunch and supper. During seasons or days of fasting, just one meal is provided. The hermit makes his needs known to the lay brother by means of a note, requesting items such as a fresh loaf of bread, which will be kept in the cell for eating with several meals. Carthusians observe a perpetual abstinence from meat.

The hermit spends most of his day in the cell: he meditates, prays the minor hours of the Liturgy of the Hours on his own, eats, studies and writes, and works in his garden or at some manual trade. Unless required by other duties, the Carthusian hermit leaves his cell daily only for three prayer services in the monastery chapel, including the community Mass, and occasionally for conferences with his superior. Additionally, once a week, the community members take a long walk in the countryside during which they may speak. On Sundays and solemn feast days a community meal is taken in silence. Twice a year there is a day-long community recreation, and the monk may receive an annual visit from immediate family members.

=== Lay brothers ===
There have always been lay brothers in the charterhouse. When Bruno retired to the Chartreuse, two of his companions were secular ones: Andrew and Guerin. They also live a life of solitary prayer and join in the communal prayer and Mass in the chapel. However, the lay brothers are monks under a slightly different type of vows and spend less time in contemplative prayer and more time in manual labour. The lay brothers provide material assistance to the choir monks: cooking meals, doing laundry, undertaking physical repairs, providing the choir monks with books from the library and managing supplies. The life of the brothers complements that of the choir monks and makes the fathers' lives of seclusion possible.

During the brothers' seven-year formation period, some time is given each day to the study of the Bible, theology, liturgy, and spirituality. They can continue their studies throughout their lives. All of the monks live lives of silence.

The Carthusians do not engage in work of a pastoral or missionary nature. Unlike most monasteries, they do not have retreatants, and those who visit for a prolonged period are people who are contemplating entering the monastery. As far as possible, the monks have no contact with the outside world.

Carthusian nuns live a life similar to the monks but with some differences. Choir nuns tend to lead somewhat less eremitical lives, while still maintaining a strong commitment to solitude and silence.

== Modern Carthusians ==
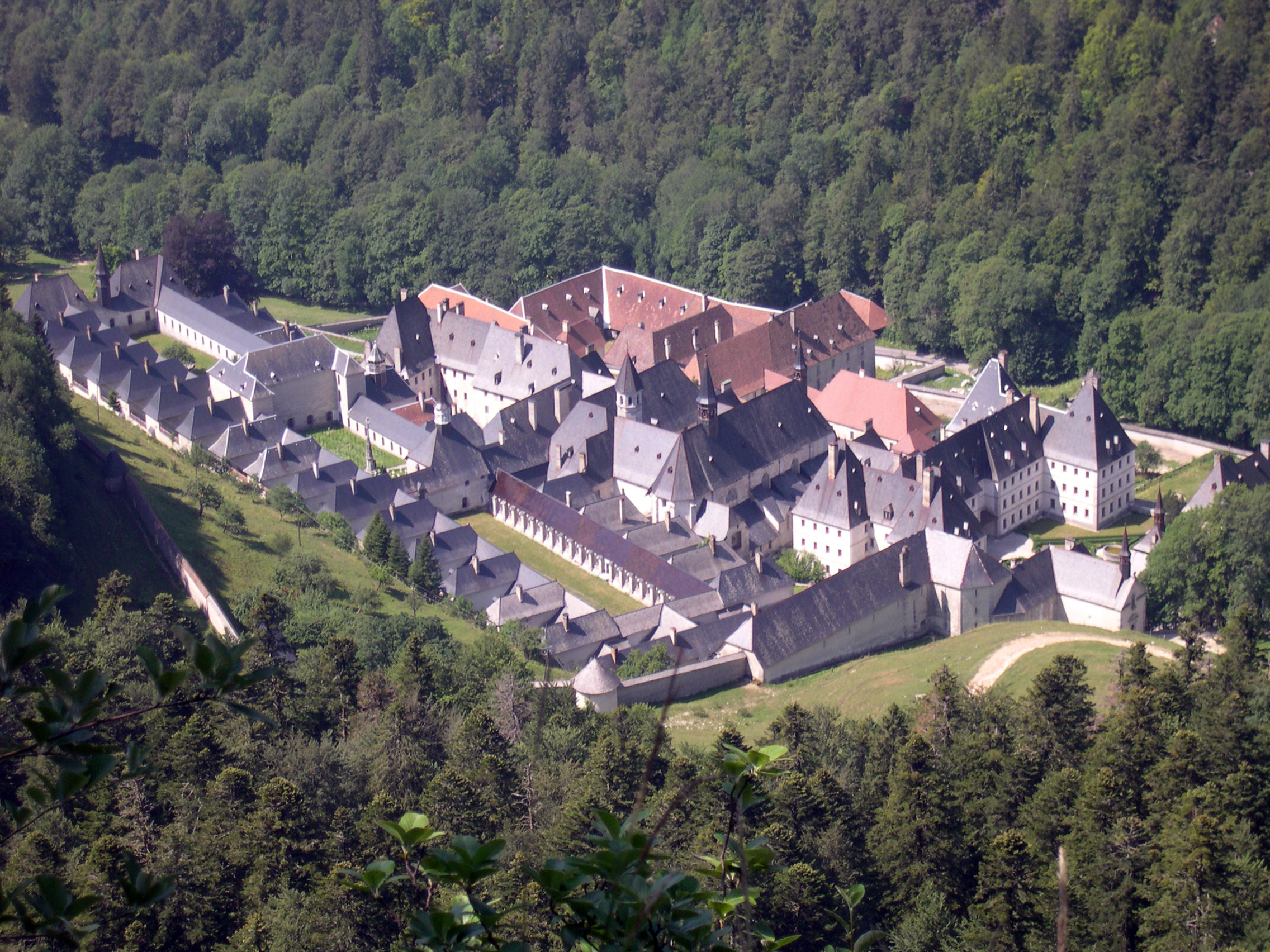
The Grande Chartreuse is the head monastery of the Carthusian order.

Today, the monastery of the Grande Chartreuse is still the Motherhouse of the order. There is a museum illustrating the history of the Carthusian order next to Grande Chartreuse; the monks of that monastery are also involved in producing Chartreuse liqueur. Visits are not possible into the Grande Chartreuse itself, but the 2005 documentary Into Great Silence gave unprecedented views of life within the hermitage.

Today, Carthusians live very much as they originally did, without any relaxing of their rules. Generally, those wishing to enter must be between the ages of twenty-one and forty-five. Nowadays, medical examinations are considered necessary before the Novitiate and Profession. The Carthusian novice is introduced to Lectio divina (spiritual reading).

In the 21st century, the Sélignac Charterhouse, near Simandre sur Suran in France, was converted into a house in which lay people could come and experience Carthusian retreats, living the Carthusian life for shorter periods (an eight-day retreat being fixed as the minimum, to enter at least somewhat into the silent rhythm of the charterhouse).

== Liturgy ==
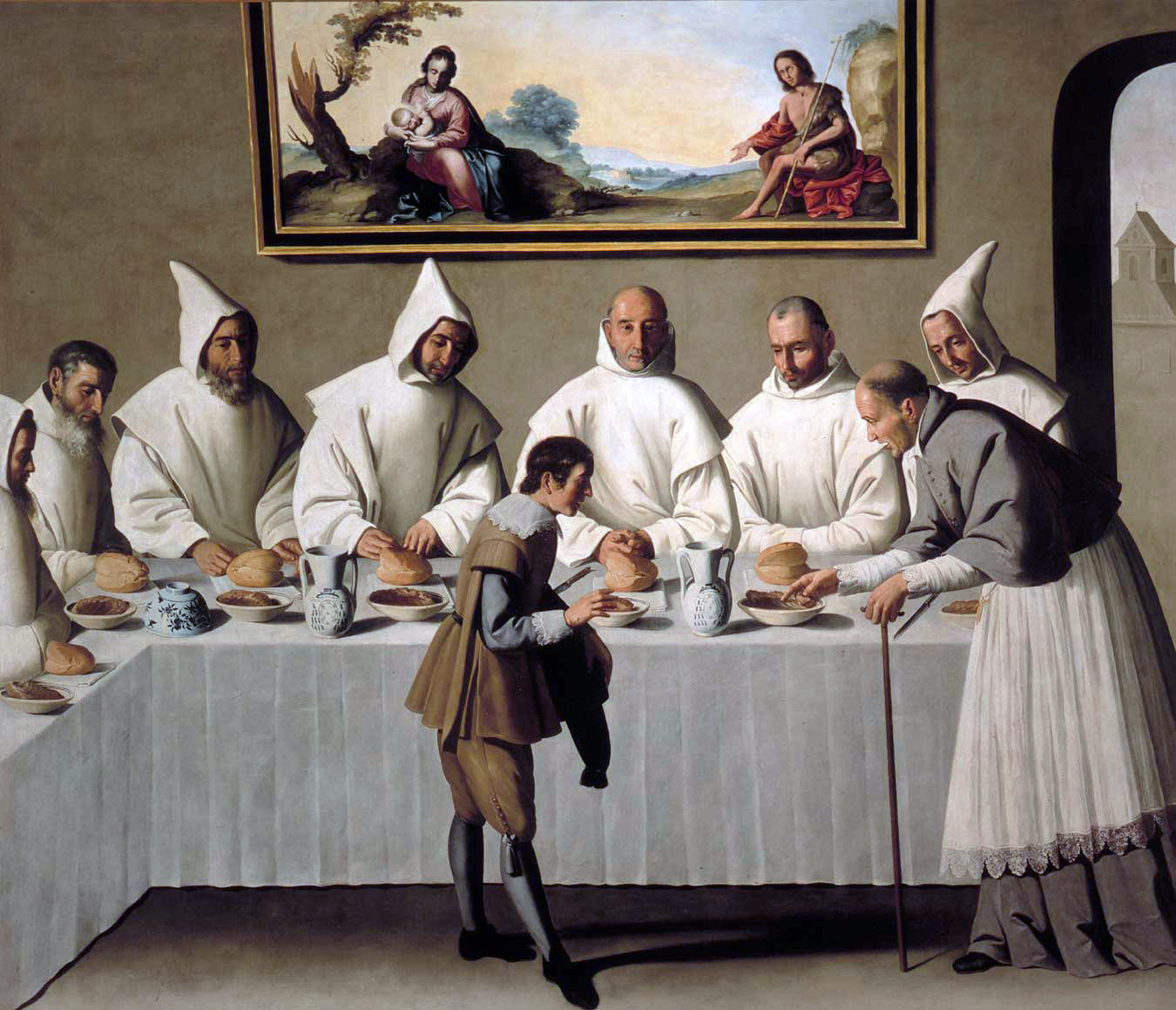
Painting in the Charterhouse of Nuestra Señora de las Cuevas in Seville by Francisco de Zurbarán. The scene depicts Hugh of Grenoble with his brothers in the refectory.

Before the Council of Trent in the 16th century, the Catholic Church in Western Europe had a wide variety of rituals for the celebration of Mass. Although the essentials were the same, there were variations in prayers and practices from region to region or among the various religious orders.

When Pope Pius V made the Roman Missal mandatory for all Catholics of the Latin Church, he permitted the continuance of other forms of celebrating Mass that had an antiquity of at least two centuries. The rite used by the Carthusians was one of these and continues in use in a version revised in 1981. Apart from the new elements in this revision, it is substantially the rite of Grenoble in the 12th century, with some admixture from other sources. According to current Catholic legislation, priests can celebrate the traditional rites of their order without further authorization.

A feature unique to Carthusian liturgical practice is that the bishop bestows on Carthusian nuns, in the ceremony of their profession, a stole and a maniple. The nun, who may receive the consecration of virgins is then also invested with a crown and a ring. The nun wears these ornaments again only on the day of her monastic jubilee and on her bier after her death. At Matins, if no priest or deacon is present, a nun assumes the stole and reads the Gospel; and although in the time of the Tridentine Mass the chanting of the Epistle was reserved to an ordained subdeacon, a consecrated virgin sang the Epistle at the conventual Mass, though without wearing the maniple. For centuries Carthusian nuns retained this rite, administered by the diocesan bishop four years after the nun took her vows.

== Formation ==
The formation of a Carthusian begins with 6 to 12 months of postulancy. This is followed by two years of novitiate, where the novice wears a black cloak over the white Carthusian habit. Subsequently, the novice takes simple vows and becomes a junior professed for three years, during which the professed wears the full Carthusian habit. The simple vows may be renewed for another two years. Finally, the Carthusian makes the solemn profession.

As of March 2024, there are 21 extant charterhouses, 16 for monks and 5 for nuns: (Note: Including Sélignac Charterhouse, which has been a lay house since 2001, but not including the Hermits of St. Bruno at Parisot.): Argentina (1), Brazil (1), France (6), Germany (1), Italy (3), Korea (2), Portugal (1), Slovenia (1), Spain (4), Switzerland (1), the United Kingdom (1) and the United States (1).

== Saints, blesseds, and other holy people ==
Saints

- Bruno of Cologne (c. 1030 – 6 October 1101), founder of the order, canonized on 17 February 1623
- Hugues de Châteauneuf (1053 – 1 April 1132), Bishop of Grenoble, canonized on 22 April 1134
- Guigo I (Guigues du Chastel) (c. 1083 - c. 1136), 5th Prior of Grande Chartreuse Monastery
- Hugh of Lincoln (c. 1135/40 - 16 November 1200), Bishop of Lincoln, canonized on 17 February 1220
- Arthaud of Belley (c. 1101 - c. 1206), Bishop of Belley, canonized on 2 June 1834
- John Houghton (c. 1487 – 4 May 1535), prior of the London Charterhouse and protomartyr of the English Reformation, canonized on 25 October 1970
- Robert Lawrence (c. 1485 – 4 May 1535), prior of Beauvale Priory and protomartyr of the English Reformation, canonized on 25 October 1970
- Augustine Webster (died 4 May 1535), prior of prior of Our Lady of Melwood in Axholme, protomartyr of the English Reformation, canonized on 25 October 1970

Blesseds

- Lanuino il Normanno (died possibly 11 April 1116), monk, beatified on 4 February 1893
- Guglielmo di Fenoglio da Casotto (c. 1065 - c. 1120), monk, beatified on 29 March 1860
- Airald de Saint-Jean-de-Maurienne (died 2 January 1146), Bishop of Saint-Jean-de-Maurienne, beatified on 8 January 1863
- Juan de España (c. 1123 - 25 June 1160), professed religious, beatified on 14 July 1864
- Oddone da Novara (c. 1105 – 14 January 1200), priest, beatified on 31 May 1859
- Étienne de Châtillon (c. 1150 or 1155 - 7 September 1208), Bishop of Die, beatified on 10 September 1857
- Beatrix d’Ornacieux (c. 1240 – c. 1306/09), nun, beatified on 15 April 1869
- Rosaline de Villeneuve (c. 1263 – January 17, 1329), nun, beatified on 9 May 1851
- Pierre de Luxembourg (19 July 1369 – 2 July 1387), Bishop of Metz and Cardinal, beatified on 9 April 1527
- Niccolò Albergati (c. 1373 – 9 May 1443), Bishop of Bologna and Cardinal, beatified on 25 September 1744
- Humphrey Middlemore (died 19 June 1535), vicar of the London Charterhouse, martyr of the English Reformation, beatified on 29 December 1886
- William Exmew (died 19 June 1535), procurator of the London Charterhouse, martyr of the English Reformation, beatified on 29 December 1886
- Sebastian Newdigate (7 September 1500 – 19 June 1535), choir monk of the London Charterhouse, martyr of the English Reformation, beatified on 29 December 1886
- John Rochester (c. 1498 – 11 May 1537), choir monk of the London Charterhouse, martyr of the English Reformation, beatified on 29 December 1886
- James Walworth (died 11 May 1537), choir monk of the London Charterhouse, martyr of the English Reformation, beatified on 29 December 1886
- William Greenwood (died 6 June 1537), laybrother of the London Charterhouse, martyr of the English Reformation, beatified on 29 December 1886
- John Davy (died 8 June 1537), deacona and choir monk of the London Charterhouse, martyr of the English Reformation, beatified on 29 December 1886
- Robert Salt (died 9 June 1537), laybrother of the London Charterhouse, martyr of the English Reformation, beatified on 29 December 1886
- Walter Pierson (died 10 June 1537), laybrother of the London Charterhouse, martyr of the English Reformation, beatified on 29 December 1886
- Thomas Green (died 10 June 1537), choir monk of the London Charterhouse, martyr of the English Reformation, beatified on 29 December 1886
- Thomas Scryven (died 15 June 1537), laybrother of the London Charterhouse, martyr of the English Reformation, beatified on 29 December 1886
- Thomas Redyng (died 16 June 1537), laybrother of the London Charterhouse, martyr of the English Reformation, beatified on 29 December 1886
- Richard Bere (died 9 August 1537), choir monk of the London Charterhouse, martyr of the English Reformation, beatified on 29 December 1886
- Thomas Johnson (died 20 September 1537), choir monk of the London Charterhouse, martyr of the English Reformation, beatified on 29 December 1886
- William Horne (died 4 August 1540), laybrother of the London Charterhouse, martyr of the English Reformation, beatified on 29 December 1886
- Claude Beguignot (19 September 1736 - 16 July 1794), Martyr of the French Revolution, beatified on 1 October 1995
- Lazare Tiersot (29 March 1739 - 10 August 1794), Martyr of the French Revolution, beatified on 1 October 1995

Declared Blessed by popular acclaim

- Marguerite d’Oyngt (c. 1240 – 11 February 1310), mystic
- Pietro Petroni (c. 1311 – 29 May 1361), professed religious
- Stefano Maconi (c. 1347 – 7 August 1424), professed religious

Servants of God

- Étienne [Ballet] Balley (c. 1733 - 14 January 1794), Martyr of the French Revolution, declared Servant of God on 20 June 2023
- Jacques (Dominique) Mollière (9 June 1743 - 2 February 1794), Martyr of the French Revolution, declared Servant of God on 20 June 2023
- Benoît (Michel) Poncet (22 December 1754 - 5 April 1794), Martyr of the French Revolution, declared Servant of God on 20 June 2023
- Thomas (Marcel) Liottier (30 March 1748 - 5 April 1794), Martyr of the French Revolution, declared Servant of God on 20 June 2023
- Jean-Ignace (Pacôme) Lessus (14 April 1766 - 25 April 1794), Martyr of the French Revolution
- Philippine (Aldegonde) Hennecart de Briffoeuil (14 September 1725 - 25 June 1794), nun and Martyr of the French Revolution
- Marie-Thérèse-Albertine (Albertine) Briois (c. 1727 - 27 June 1794), nun and Martyr of the French Revolution
- Mathurin Léon (26 August 1746 - 27 June 1794), Martyr of the French Revolution
- Félix-Prosper Nonant (8 May 1725 - 9 July 1794), Martyr of the French Revolution
- Pierre (Chrysogone) Honoré (13 March 1735 – 16 October 1794), Martyr of the French Revolution
- Jean-François (Charles) Lecoutre (24 January 1736 – 16 October 1794), Martyr of the French Revolution
- Antoine-Joseph (Bernard) Ledoux (3 June 1752 – 16 October 1794), Martyr of the French Revolution
- Salvador (Bernardo) Montes de Oca (21 October 1895 - 7 September 1944), Bishop of Valencia and martyr

== Notable Carthusians ==
- Guigo II
- Hugh of Balma
- Ludolph of Saxony (1295–1378)
- Dominic of Prussia (1382–1461)
- Denis the Carthusian (1402–1471)
- Andreas Pannonius (1420–1472)
- Peter Blomevenna (1466–1536)

== See also ==
- Into Great Silence
- List of Carthusian monasteries
- Carthusian Martyrs
- Institution des Chartreux
- Monastic Family of Bethlehem, of the Assumption of the Virgin and of Saint Bruno
- Spatiamentum
- Broken Silence, a fictional 1996 movie on the potential challenges of modern Carthusian exclaustration
- Corroirie
- Carthusian Spanish horse
- Mélan Charterhouse
