= Robert Lawrence (martyr) =

English Roman Catholic saint

Saint Robert Lawrence OCart.

Martyr
- Born: c.1485
- Died: 4 May 1535 (aged 49 – 50); Tyburn, London, England
- Honored in: Roman Catholic Church
- Beatified: 29 December 1886 by Pope Leo XIII
- Canonized: 25 October 1970 by Pope Paul VI
- Feast: 4 May (individual), 25 October (collectively with Forty Martyrs of England and Wales)
- Attributes: martyr's palm

Robert Lawrence, OCart (died 4 May 1535) was one of the Forty Martyrs of England and Wales. He was hanged, drawn, and quartered at Tyburn for declining to sign the Oath of Supremacy. His feast day is 4 May.

== Life ==
Born about 1485, Robert Lawrence was a graduate of Cambridge. After joining the Carthusians, in 1531, he succeeded John Houghton as Prior of the Beauvale Priory, Nottinghamshire, when Houghton was appointed Prior of the London Charterhouse.

By February 1535 Parliament declared that everyone had to take the Oath of Supremacy, declaring King Henry VIII to be Supreme Head of the Church of England. Lawrence went with Houghton to see Thomas Cromwell, who had them arrested and placed in the Tower of London. When they refused to sign the Oath of Supremacy, they were hanged, drawn and quartered at Tyburn, making them among the first Carthusian martyrs in England.

Beatified in 1886, Robert was canonized by Pope Paul VI with thirty-nine other martyrs on 25 October 1970.

== See also ==
- Richard Reynolds
- Forty Martyrs of England and Wales
- Carthusian Martyrs of London
- Carthusian Martyrs
