= August 7 =

August 7 this year in various calendars
- Friday, 7 August 2026
Other calendars
Armenian	18 Nawasardi 1476
Aztec	Pānquetzaliztli 9, 2 Ōlīn
Babylonian	23 Du'uzu, 2337 SE
Balinese pawukon	Luang, Pepet, Beteng, Jaya, Umanis, Was, Sukra of Merakih, Guru, Ogan, Pati
Bengali	23 Shrabon, BS 1433
Chinese	Yin Water Ox・Bond Mansion; 25 Liùyuè, Bǐngwǔnián (Liqiu, 16 days until Chushu)
Common Era	7 August 2026 CE
Coptic	1 Mesori, AM 1742
Egyptian	23 Choiak, 2775 NE
Ethiopian	1 Naḥasē, 2018 Amätä Məhrät
French Republican	Décade II, Décadi de Thermidor de l'Année 234 de la République
Gregorian	7 August, AD 2026
Hebrew	24 Av, AM 5786
Hindu	5127 KY・1,872,794・Rāudra; Solar: 22 Śrāvaṇa, 1948 SE; Lunisolar: Navamī, Kṛishna pakṣa of Āṣāḍha, 2083 VE
Icelandic	Föstudagur, 13 Heyannir 2026
Islamic	22 Safar, AH 1448 (using tabular method)
ISO week date	2026-W32-5
Japanese	25 Minazuki, Reiwa 8 (Risshū, 16 days until Shosho)
Julian	25 July, AD 2026 (AM 7534)
Julian day	2461260
Maya	13.0.13.14.17; 10 Yaxkin, 2 Caban
Roman	ante diem VIII Kalendas Augustas, MMDCCLXXIX AUC
Solar Hijri	16 Mordad, SH 1405

<<	August					>>
Su	Mo	Tu	We	Th	Fr	Sa
						1
2	3	4	5	6	7	8
9	10	11	12	13	14	15
16	17	18	19	20	21	22
23	24	25	26	27	28	29
30	31
2026

August 7 in recent years
2026 (Friday)
2025 (Thursday)
2024 (Wednesday)
2023 (Monday)
2022 (Sunday)
2021 (Saturday)
2020 (Friday)
2019 (Wednesday)
2018 (Tuesday)
2017 (Monday)

August 7 is the 219th day of the year (220th in leap years) in the Gregorian calendar; 146 days remain until the end of the year.

== Events ==
=== Pre-1600 ===
- 461 – Roman Emperor Majorian is beheaded near the river Iria in north-west Italy following his arrest and deposition by the magister militum Ricimer.
- 610 – Byzantine–Sasanian War of 602–628: Sassanid troops under general Shahrbaraz conquer the town of Zenobia.
- 626 – The Avar and Slav armies leave the siege of Constantinople.
- 768 – Pope Stephen III is elected to office, and quickly seeks Frankish protection against the Lombard threat, since the Byzantine Empire is no longer able to help.
- 936 – Coronation of King Otto I of Germany.
- 1461 – The Ming dynasty Chinese military general Cao Qin stages a coup against the Tianshun Emperor.
- 1479 – Battle of Guinegate: French troops of King Louis XI are defeated by the Burgundians led by Archduke Maximilian of Habsburg.

=== 1601–1900 ===
- 1679 – The brigantine Le Griffon becomes the first ship to sail the upper Great Lakes of North America.
- 1714 – The Battle of Gangut: The first important victory of the Russian Navy.
- 1743 – The Treaty of Åbo ends the 1741–1743 Russo-Swedish War.
- 1782 – George Washington orders the creation of the Badge of Military Merit to honor soldiers wounded in battle. It is later renamed to the more poetic Purple Heart.
- 1786 – The first federal Indian Reservation is created by the United States.
- 1789 – The United States Department of War is established.
- 1791 – American troops destroy the Miami town of Kenapacomaqua near the site of present-day Logansport, Indiana in the Northwest Indian War.
- 1794 – U.S. President George Washington invokes the Militia Acts of 1792 to suppress the Whiskey Rebellion in western Pennsylvania.
- 1819 – Simón Bolívar triumphs over Spain in the Battle of Boyacá.
- 1858 – The first Australian rules football match is played between Melbourne Grammar and Scotch College.
- 1890 – Anna Månsdotter, found guilty of the 1889 Yngsjö murder, becomes the last woman to be executed in Sweden.

=== 1901–present ===
- 1909 – Alice Huyler Ramsey and three friends become the first women to complete a transcontinental auto trip, taking 59 days to travel from New York, New York to San Francisco, California.
- 1926 – The first British Grand Prix was held at Brooklands.
- 1927 – The Peace Bridge opens between Fort Erie, Ontario and Buffalo, New York.
- 1930 – The last confirmed lynching of black people in the Northern United States occurs in Marion, Indiana; two men, Thomas Shipp and Abram Smith, are murdered.
- 1933 – The Kingdom of Iraq slaughters over 3,000 Assyrians in the village of Simele. This date is recognized as Martyrs Day or National Day of Mourning by the Assyrian community in memory of the Simele massacre.
- 1942 – World War II: The Battle of Guadalcanal begins as the United States Marines initiate the first American offensive of the war with landings on Guadalcanal and Tulagi in the Solomon Islands.
- 1944 – IBM dedicates the first program-controlled calculator, the Automatic Sequence Controlled Calculator (known best as the Harvard Mark I).
- 1946 – The government of the Soviet Union presented a note to its Turkish counterparts which refuted the latter's sovereignty over the Turkish Straits, thus beginning the Turkish Straits crisis.
- 1947 – Thor Heyerdahl's balsa wood raft, the Kon-Tiki, smashes into the reef at Raroia in the Tuamotu Islands after a 101-day, 7,000 kilometres (4,300 mi) journey across the Pacific Ocean in an attempt to prove that pre-historic peoples could have traveled from South America.
- 1947 – The Bombay Municipal Corporation formally takes over the Bombay Electric Supply and Transport (BEST).
- 1959 – Explorer program: Explorer 6 launches from the Atlantic Missile Range in Cape Canaveral, Florida.
- 1960 – Ivory Coast becomes independent from France.
- 1962 – Canadian-born American pharmacologist Frances Oldham Kelsey is awarded the U.S. President's Award for Distinguished Federal Civilian Service for her refusal to authorize thalidomide.
- 1964 – Vietnam War: The U.S. Congress passes the Gulf of Tonkin Resolution giving U.S. President Lyndon B. Johnson broad war powers to deal with North Vietnamese attacks on American forces.
- 1969 – Richard Nixon appoints Luis R. Bruce, a Mohawk-Oglala Sioux and co-founder of the National Congress of American Indians, as the new commissioner of the Bureau of Indian Affairs.
- 1970 – California judge Harold Haley is taken hostage in his courtroom and killed during an effort to free George Jackson from police custody.
- 1974 – Philippe Petit performs a high wire act between the Twin Towers of the World Trade Center 1,368 feet (417 m) in the air.
- 1976 – Viking program: Viking 2 enters orbit around Mars.
- 1978 – U.S. President Jimmy Carter declares a federal emergency at Love Canal due to toxic waste that had been disposed of negligently.
- 1981 – The Washington Star ceases all operations after 128 years of publication.
- 1985 – Takao Doi, Mamoru Mohri and Chiaki Mukai are chosen to be Japan's first astronauts.
- 1987 – Cold War: Lynne Cox becomes the first person to swim from the United States to the Soviet Union, crossing the Bering Strait from Little Diomede Island in Alaska to Big Diomede in the Soviet Union.
- 1989 – U.S. Congressman Mickey Leland (D-TX) and 15 others die in a plane crash in Ethiopia.
- 1989 – The National Cold Fusion Institute opened in Salt Lake City.
- 1990 – First American soldiers arrive in Saudi Arabia as part of the Gulf War.
- 1993 – Ada Deer, a Menominee activist, is sworn in as the head of the Bureau of Indian Affairs.
- 1995 – The Chilean government declares state of emergency in the southern half of the country in response to an event of intense, cold, wind, rain and snowfall known as the White Earthquake.
- 1997 – Space Shuttle Program: The Space Shuttle Discovery launches on STS-85 from the Kennedy Space Center in Cape Canaveral, Florida.
- 1997 – Fine Air Flight 101 crashes after takeoff from Miami International Airport, killing five people.
- 1998 – Bombings at United States embassies in Dar es Salaam, Tanzania and Nairobi, Kenya kill approximately 212 people.
- 1999 – The Chechnya-based Islamic International Brigade invades neighboring Dagestan.
- 2007 – At AT&T Park, Barry Bonds hits his 756th career home run to surpass Hank Aaron's 33-year-old record.
- 2008 – The start of the Russo-Georgian War over the territory of South Ossetia.
- 2020 – Air India Express Flight 1344 overshoots the runway at Calicut International Airport in the Malappuram district of Kerala, India, and crashes, killing 21 of the 190 people on board.
- 2026 – Debsirin Nonthaburi school shooting

== Births ==
=== Pre-1600 ===
- 317 – Constantius II, Roman emperor (died 361)
- 1282 – Elizabeth of Rhuddlan (died 1316)
- 1533 – Alonso de Ercilla, Spanish soldier and poet (died 1595)
- 1560 – Elizabeth Báthory, Hungarian aristocrat and purported serial killer (died 1614)
- 1571 – Thomas Lupo, English viol player and composer (died 1627)
- 1574 – Robert Dudley, English explorer and cartographer (died 1649)
- 1598 – Georg Stiernhielm, Swedish poet and linguist (died 1672)

=== 1601–1900 ===
- 1613 – William Frederick, Prince of Nassau-Dietz, Dutch stadtholder (died 1664)
- 1702 – Muhammad Shah, Mughal emperor of India (died 1748)
- 1726 – James Bowdoin, American banker and politician, 2nd Governor of Massachusetts (died 1790)
- 1742 – Nathanael Greene, American general (died 1786)
- 1751 – Wilhelmina of Prussia, Princess of Orange (died 1820)
- 1779 – Carl Ritter, German geographer and academic (died 1859)
- 1826 – August Ahlqvist, Finnish professor, poet, scholar of the Finno-Ugric languages, author, and literary critic (died 1889)
- 1844 – Auguste Michel-Lévy, French geologist and author (died 1911)
- 1846 – Anna Swan, Canadian giantess at 7ft 11in (died 1888)
- 1862 – Henri Le Sidaner, French painter (died 1939)
- 1862 – Victoria of Baden (died 1931)
- 1867 – Emil Nolde, Danish-German painter and illustrator (died 1956)
- 1868 – Ladislaus Bortkiewicz, Russian-German economist and statistician (died 1931)
- 1868 – Huntley Wright, English actor (died 1941)
- 1869 – Mary Frances Winston, American mathematician (died 1959)
- 1876 – Mata Hari, Dutch dancer and spy (died 1917)
- 1879 – Johannes Kotze, South African cricketer (died 1931)
- 1884 – Billie Burke, American actress and singer (died 1970)
- 1884 – Nikolai Triik, Estonian painter and illustrator (died 1940)
- 1887 – Anna Elisabet Weirauch, German author and playwright (died 1970)
- 1890 – Elizabeth Gurley Flynn, American author and activist (died 1964)

=== 1901–present ===
- 1901 – Ann Harding, American actress and singer (died 1981)
- 1903 – Louis Leakey, Kenyan-English palaeontologist and archaeologist (died 1972)
- 1904 – Ralph Bunche, American political scientist, academic, and diplomat, Nobel Prize laureate (died 1971)
- 1907 – Albert Kotin, Belarusian-American soldier and painter (died 1980)
- 1911 – István Bibó, Hungarian lawyer and politician (died 1979)
- 1911 – Nicholas Ray, American director and screenwriter (died 1979)
- 1916 – Kermit Love, American actor, puppeteer, and costume designer (died 2008)
- 1918 – C. Buddingh', Dutch poet and translator (died 1985)
- 1918 – Gordon Zahn, American sociologist and author (died 2007)
- 1921 – Manitas de Plata, French guitarist (died 2014)
- 1921 – Karel Husa, Czech-American composer and conductor (died 2016)
- 1925 – Felice Bryant, American songwriter (died 2003)
- 1926 – Stan Freberg, American puppeteer, voice actor, and singer (died 2015)
- 1927 – Edwin Edwards, American soldier, lawyer, and politician, 50th Governor of Louisiana (died 2021)
- 1928 – Betsy Byars, American author and academic (died 2020)
- 1928 – Owen Luder, English architect, designed Tricorn Centre and Trinity Square (died 2021)
- 1928 – James Randi, Canadian-American stage magician and author (died 2020)
- 1929 – Don Larsen, American baseball player (died 2020)
- 1930 – Togrul Narimanbekov, Azerbaijani-French painter and academic (died 2013)
- 1930 – Veljo Tormis, Estonian composer and educator (died 2017)
- 1932 – Abebe Bikila, Ethiopian runner (died 1973)
- 1932 – Edward Hardwicke, English actor (died 2011)
- 1932 – Rien Poortvliet, Dutch painter and illustrator (died 1995)
- 1932 – Maurice Rabb Jr., American ophthalmologist and academic (died 2005)
- 1933 – Eddie Firmani, South African footballer and manager
- 1933 – Elinor Ostrom, American economist and academic, Nobel Prize laureate (died 2012)
- 1933 – Jerry Pournelle, American journalist and author (died 2017)
- 1933 – Alberto Romulo, Filipino politician and diplomat
- 1934 – Sándor Simó, Hungarian director, producer, and screenwriter (died 2001)
- 1935 – Lee Corso, American college football coach and broadcaster
- 1935 – Rahsaan Roland Kirk, American saxophonist and composer (died 1977)
- 1937 – Zoltán Berczik, Hungarian table tennis player and coach (died 2011)
- 1937 – Don Wilson, English cricketer and coach (died 2012)
- 1938 – Helen Caldicott, Australian physician and anti-nuclear activist
- 1938 – Giorgetto Giugiaro, Italian automotive designer
- 1940 – Jean-Luc Dehaene, French-Belgian lawyer and politician, 63rd Prime Minister of Belgium (died 2014)
- 1940 – Uwe Nettelbeck, German record producer, journalist and film critic (died 2007)
- 1941 – Matthew Evans, Baron Evans of Temple Guiting, English publisher and politician (died 2016)
- 1942 – Garrison Keillor, American humorist, novelist, short story writer, and radio host
- 1942 – Carlos Monzón, Argentinian boxer and actor (died 1995)
- 1942 – Caetano Veloso, Brazilian singer-songwriter, writer and producer
- 1942 – Richard Sykes, English biochemist and academic
- 1942 – B. J. Thomas, American singer (died 2021)
- 1943 – Mohammed Badie, Egyptian religious leader
- 1943 – Lana Cantrell, Australian singer-songwriter and lawyer
- 1943 – Alain Corneau, French director and screenwriter (died 2010)
- 1944 – John Glover, American actor
- 1944 – Robert Mueller, American soldier and lawyer, 6th Director of the Federal Bureau of Investigation (died 2026)
- 1945 – Kenny Ireland, Scottish actor and director (died 2014)
- 1945 – Alan Page, American football player and jurist
- 1947 – Franciscus Henri, Dutch-Australian singer-songwriter
- 1947 – Sofia Rotaru, Ukrainian singer-songwriter, producer, and actress
- 1948 – Marty Appel, American businessman and author
- 1948 – Greg Chappell, Australian cricketer and coach
- 1949 – Walid Jumblatt, Lebanese journalist and politician
- 1949 – Matthew Parris, South African-English journalist and politician
- 1950 – Rodney Crowell, American singer-songwriter and guitarist
- 1950 – Alan Keyes, American politician and diplomat, 16th Assistant Secretary of State for International Organization Affairs
- 1950 – S. Thandayuthapani, Sri Lankan educator and politician
- 1952 – Caroline Aaron, American actress and producer
- 1952 – Eamonn Darcy, Irish golfer
- 1952 – Kees Kist, Dutch footballer
- 1952 – Alexei Sayle, English comedian, actor, and author
- 1953 – Anne Fadiman, American journalist and author
- 1954 – Valery Gazzaev, Russian footballer, manager and politician
- 1954 – Jonathan Pollard, Israeli spy
- 1954 – Alan Reid, Scottish politician
- 1955 – Wayne Knight, American actor, comedian and voice actor
- 1955 – Greg Nickels, American lawyer and politician, 51st Mayor of Seattle
- 1955 – Vladimir Sorokin, Russian author and playwright
- 1957 – Daire Brehan, Irish journalist, lawyer, and actress (died 2012)
- 1957 – Alexander Dityatin, Russian gymnast and colonel
- 1958 – Russell Baze, Canadian-American jockey
- 1958 – Bruce Dickinson, English singer-songwriter and guitarist
- 1958 – Alberto Salazar, Cuban-American runner and coach
- 1959 – Koenraad Elst, Belgian orientalist and author
- 1959 – Ali Shah, Zimbabwean cricketer and coach
- 1960 – David Duchovny, American actor, director, producer, and screenwriter
- 1961 – Brian Conley, English actor and singer
- 1961 – Yelena Davydova, Russian gymnast
- 1961 – Walter Swinburn, English jockey and trainer (died 2016)
- 1961 – Carlos Vives, Colombian singer, songwriter, and actor
- 1962 – Alison Brown, American banjo player, songwriter, and producer
- 1963 – Paul Dunn, Australian rugby league player
- 1963 – Nick Gillespie, American journalist and author
- 1963 – Marcus Roberts, American pianist and educator
- 1964 – John Birmingham, English-Australian journalist and author
- 1964 – Ian Dench, English guitarist and songwriter
- 1964 – Peter Niven, Scottish jockey
- 1965 – Raul Malo, American singer-songwriter, guitarist, and producer (died 2025)
- 1965 – Elizabeth Manley, Canadian figure skater
- 1966 – David Cairns, Scottish laicised priest and politician, Minister of State for Scotland (died 2011)
- 1966 – Shobna Gulati, British actress
- 1966 – Kristin Hersh, American singer-songwriter and guitarist
- 1967 – Jason Grimsley, American baseball player
- 1968 – Francesca Gregorini, Italian-American director and screenwriter
- 1968 – Trevor Hendy, Australian surfer and coach
- 1968 – Sophie Lee, Australian actress and author
- 1969 – Markus Bundi, Swiss writer
- 1969 – Paul Lambert, Scottish footballer and manager
- 1969 – Dana G. Peleg, Israeli writer and LGBT activist
- 1970 – Eric Namesnik, American swimmer (died 2006)
- 1971 – Dominic Cork, England cricketer and sportscaster
- 1971 – Rachel York, American actress and singer
- 1972 – Gerry Peñalosa, Filipino boxer and promoter
- 1973 – Mikhail Gorsheniov, Russian singer-songwriter (died 2013)
- 1973 – Danny Graves, Vietnamese-American baseball player
- 1973 – Kevin Muscat, English-Australian footballer, coach, and manager
- 1974 – Chico Benymon, American actor
- 1974 – Michael Shannon, American actor
- 1975 – Koray Candemir, Turkish singer-songwriter
- 1975 – Gerard Denton, Australian cricketer
- 1975 – Megan Gale, Australian model and actress
- 1975 – Ray Hill, American football player (died 2015)
- 1975 – Rebecca Kleefisch, American journalist and politician, 44th Lieutenant Governor of Wisconsin
- 1975 – Édgar Rentería, Colombian baseball player
- 1975 – Charlize Theron, South African actress
- 1976 – Dimitrios Eleftheropoulos, Greek footballer and manager
- 1976 – Shane Lechler, American football player
- 1977 – Charlotte Ronson, English fashion designer
- 1977 – Samantha Ronson, English singer-songwriter and DJ
- 1977 – Justin Brooker, Australian rugby league player
- 1978 – Alexandre Aja, French director, producer, and screenwriter
- 1978 – Jamey Jasta, American singer-songwriter
- 1978 – Mark McCammon, English-Barbadian footballer
- 1978 – Cirroc Lofton, American actor
- 1979 – Eric Johnson, American actor, director, and screenwriter
- 1979 – Miguel Llera, Spanish footballer
- 1979 – Abigail Spanberger, American politician, intelligence officer, and first female governor of Virginia
- 1979 – Birgit Zotz, Austrian anthropologist and author
- 1980 – Carsten Busch, German footballer
- 1980 – Aurélie Claudel, French model and actress
- 1980 – Tácio Caetano Cruz Queiroz, Brazilian footballer
- 1980 – Seiichiro Maki, Japanese footballer
- 1981 – David Testo, American soccer player
- 1981 – Randy Wayne, American actor and producer
- 1982 – Ángeles Balbiani, Argentine actress and singer
- 1982 – Abbie Cornish, Australian actress
- 1982 – Juan Martín Hernández, Argentine rugby player
- 1982 – Marquise Hill, American football player (died 2007)
- 1982 – Vassilis Spanoulis, Greek basketball player
- 1982 – Martin Vučić, Macedonian singer and drummer
- 1983 – Christian Chávez, Mexican singer-songwriter and actor
- 1983 – Murat Dalkılıç, Turkish singer-songwriter
- 1983 – Danny, Portuguese footballer
- 1983 – Andriy Hrivko, Ukrainian cyclist
- 1983 – Mark Pettini, English cricketer and journalist
- 1984 – Stratos Perperoglou, Greek basketball player
- 1984 – Tooba Siddiqui, Pakistani model and actress
- 1984 – Yun Hyon-seok, South Korean poet and author (died 2003)
- 1986 – Paul Biedermann, German swimmer
- 1986 – Valter Birsa, Slovenian footballer
- 1986 – Altaír Jarabo, Mexican model and actress
- 1986 – Juan de la Rosa, Mexican boxer
- 1987 – Sidney Crosby, Canadian ice hockey player
- 1987 – Mustapha Dumbuya, Sierra Leonean footballer
- 1987 – Ryan Lavarnway, American baseball player
- 1987 – Rouven Sattelmaier, German footballer
- 1988 – Jonathan Bernier, Canadian ice hockey player
- 1988 – Mohamed Coulibaly, Senegalese footballer
- 1988 – Melody Oliveria, American blogger
- 1988 – Erik Pieters, Dutch footballer
- 1988 – Beanie Wells, American football player
- 1989 – DeMar DeRozan, American basketball player
- 1990 – Jake Allen, Canadian ice hockey player
- 1990 – Josh Franceschi, English singer-songwriter
- 1991 – Luis Salom, Spanish motorcycle racer (died 2016)
- 1991 – Mike Trout, American baseball player
- 1991 – Mitchell te Vrede, Dutch footballer
- 1992 – E. J. Tackett, American bowler
- 1992 – Wout Weghorst, Dutch footballer
- 1992 – Adam Yates, English cyclist
- 1992 – Simon Yates, English cyclist
- 1993 – Martti Nõmme, Estonian ski jumper
- 1993 – Karol Zalewski, Polish sprinter
- 1996 – Dani Ceballos, Spanish footballer
- 1997 – Matty Cash, English-Polish footballer
- 1997 – Kyler Murray, American football player
- 1998 – Vladimir Barbu, Italian diver
- 1998 – María Belén Bazo, Peruvian windsurfer
- 1998 – Jalen Hurts, American football player
- 1999 – Sydney McLaughlin-Levrone, American hurdler and sprinter
- 2000 – Lauren Hemp, English footballer

== Deaths ==
=== Pre-1600 ===
- 461 – Majorian, Roman emperor (born 420)
- 707 – Li Chongjun, Chinese prince
- 1028 – Alfonso V, king of León (born 994)
- 1106 – Henry IV, Holy Roman Emperor (born 1050)
- 1234 – Hugh Foliot, bishop of Hereford (born c. 1155)
- 1272 – Richard Middleton, English Lord Chancellor
- 1296 – Heinrich II von Rotteneck, prince-bishop of Regensburg
- 1385 – Joan of Kent, mother of Richard II (born 1328)
- 1485 – Alexander Stewart, duke of Albany (born 1454)
- 1547 – Cajetan, Italian priest and saint (born 1480)

=== 1601–1900 ===
- 1613 – Thomas Fleming, English judge and politician, Lord Chief Justice of England (born 1544)
- 1616 – Vincenzo Scamozzi, Italian architect, designed Teatro Olimpico (born 1548)
- 1632 – Robert de Vere, 19th Earl of Oxford, English soldier (born 1575)
- 1635 – Friedrich Spee, German poet and academic (born 1591)
- 1639 – Martin van den Hove, Dutch astronomer and mathematician (born 1605)
- 1661 – Jin Shengtan, Chinese journalist and critic (born 1608)
- 1787 – Francis Blackburne, English Anglican churchman and activist (born 1705)
- 1817 – Pierre Samuel du Pont de Nemours, French economist and politician (born 1739)
- 1834 – Joseph Marie Jacquard, French weaver and inventor, invented the Jacquard loom (born 1752)
- 1848 – Jöns Jacob Berzelius, Swedish chemist and academic (born 1779)
- 1855 – Mariano Arista, Mexican general and politician, 19th President of Mexico (born 1802)
- 1864 – Li Xiucheng, Chinese field marshal (born 1823)
- 1893 – Alfredo Catalani, Italian composer and academic (born 1854)
- 1899 – Jacob Maris, Dutch painter and educator (born 1837)
- 1900 – Wilhelm Liebknecht, German lawyer and politician (born 1826)

=== 1901–present ===
- 1912 – François-Alphonse Forel, Swiss limnologist and academic (born 1841)
- 1917 – Edwin Harris Dunning, South African-English commander and pilot (born 1891)
- 1938 – Konstantin Stanislavski, Russian actor and director (born 1863)
- 1941 – Rabindranath Tagore, Indian author, poet, and playwright, Nobel Prize laureate (born 1861)
- 1948 – Charles Bryant, English-American actor and director (born 1879)
- 1953 – Abner Powell, American baseball player and manager (born 1860)
- 1957 – Oliver Hardy, American actor, singer, and director (born 1892)
- 1958 – Elizabeth Foreman Lewis, American author and educator (born 1892)
- 1960 – Luis Ángel Firpo, Argentine boxer (born 1894)
- 1963 – Ramon Vila Capdevila, last of the Spanish Maquis, holding out after the end of the Spanish Civil War (born 1908)
- 1968 – Giovanni Bracco, Italian race car driver (born 1908)
- 1969 – Jean Bastien, French professional footballer (born 1915)
- 1969 – Joseph Kosma, Hungarian-French composer (born 1905)
- 1970 – Harold Haley, American lawyer and judge (born 1904)
- 1970 – Jonathan P. Jackson, American bodyguard and kidnapper (born 1953)
- 1972 – Joi Lansing, American model, actress, and singer (born 1929)
- 1973 – Jack Gregory, Australian cricketer (born 1895)
- 1974 – Rosario Castellanos, Mexican poet and author (born 1925)
- 1974 – Sylvio Mantha, Canadian ice hockey player and coach (born 1902)
- 1978 – Eddie Calvert, English trumpeter (born 1922)
- 1981 – Gunnar Uusi, Estonian chess player (born 1931)
- 1985 – Grayson Hall, American actress (born 1922)
- 1987 – Camille Chamoun, Lebanese lawyer and politician, 7th President of Lebanon (born 1900)
- 1989 – Mickey Leland, American lawyer and politician (born 1944)
- 1994 – Larry Martyn, English actor (born 1934)
- 1995 – Brigid Brophy, English author and critic (born 1929)
- 2001 – Algirdas Lauritėnas, Lithuanian basketball player (born 1932)
- 2003 – K. D. Arulpragasam, Sri Lankan zoologist and academic (born 1931)
- 2003 – Mickey McDermott, American baseball player and coach (born 1929)
- 2004 – Red Adair, American firefighter (born 1915)
- 2004 – Colin Bibby, English ornithologist and academic (born 1948)
- 2005 – Peter Jennings, Canadian-American journalist and author (born 1938)
- 2005 – Ester Šimerová-Martinčeková, Slovak painter (born 1909)
- 2006 – Mary Anderson Bain, American lawyer and politician (born 1911)
- 2007 – Ernesto Alonso, Mexican actor, director, and producer (born 1917)
- 2007 – Angus Tait, New Zealand businessman, founded Tait Communications (born 1919)
- 2008 – Bernie Brillstein, American talent agent and producer (born 1931)
- 2008 – Andrea Pininfarina, Italian engineer and businessman (born 1957)
- 2009 – Louis E. Saavedra, American educator and politician, 48th Mayor of Albuquerque (born 1933)
- 2009 – Mike Seeger, American singer-songwriter (born 1933)
- 2010 – John Nelder, English mathematician and statistician (born 1924)
- 2011 – Mark Hatfield, American soldier, academic, and politician, 29th Governor of Oregon (born 1922)
- 2011 – Nancy Wake, New Zealand-English captain and spy (born 1912)
- 2012 – Murtuz Alasgarov, Azerbaijani academic and politician, Speaker of the National Assembly of Azerbaijan (born 1928)
- 2012 – Judith Crist, American critic and academic (born 1922)
- 2012 – Vladimir Kobzev, Russian footballer and coach (born 1959)
- 2012 – Anna Piaggi, Italian journalist and author (born 1931)
- 2012 – Mayer Zald, American sociologist and academic (born 1931)
- 2012 – Dušan Zbavitel, Czech indologist and author (born 1925)
- 2013 – Samuel G. Armistead, American linguist, historian, and academic (born 1927)
- 2013 – Almir Kayumov, Russian footballer (born 1964)
- 2013 – Anthony Pawson, English-Canadian biologist, chemist, and academic (born 1952)
- 2013 – Margaret Pellegrini, American actress and dancer (born 1923)
- 2013 – Meeli Truu, Estonian architect (born 1946)
- 2013 – Alexander Yagubkin, Russian boxer (born 1961)
- 2014 – Víctor Fayad, Argentine lawyer and politician (born 1955)
- 2014 – Perry Moss, American football player and coach (born 1926)
- 2014 – Henry Stone, American record producer (born 1921)
- 2015 – Manuel Contreras, Chilean general (born 1929)
- 2015 – Frances Oldham Kelsey, Canadian pharmacologist and physician (born 1914)
- 2015 – Louise Suggs, American golfer, co-founded LPGA (born 1923)
- 2016 – Bryan Clauson, American racing driver (born 1989)
- 2017 – Don Baylor, American baseball player (born 1949)
- 2017 – David Maslanka, American composer (born 1943)
- 2018 – M. Karunanidhi, Indian politician, former Tamil Nadu Chief Minister and prominent leader of Tamils (born 1924)
- 2018 – Stan Mikita, Slovak hockey player (born 1940)
- 2019 – David Berman, American musician, singer, poet and cartoonist (born 1967)
- 2021 – Markie Post, American actress (born 1950)
- 2021 – Trevor Moore, American comedian (born 1980)
- 2022 – David McCullough, American historian and author (born 1933)
- 2023 – William Friedkin, American film director (born 1935)
- 2024 – Jon McBride, American astronaut (born 1943)
- 2025 – Myint Swe, retired army general and acting president of Myanmar (born 1951)

== Holidays and observances ==
- Assyrian Martyrs Day (Assyrian community)
- Battle of Boyacá Day (Colombia)
- Christian feast day:
  - Afra
  - Albert of Trapani
  - Cajetan of Thienna
  - Carpophorus and companions
  - Dometius of Persia
  - Donatus of Arezzo
  - Donatus of Besançon
  - Donatus of Muenstereifel
  - Blessed Edward Bamber, John Woodcock and Thomas Whittaker
  - Felicissimus and Agapitus
  - John Mason Neale (Episcopal Church (USA))
  - Nantovinus
  - Pope Sixtus II
  - August 7 (Eastern Orthodox liturgics)
  - Filseta (Ethiopian and Eritrean Orthodox Tewahedo Church)
- Emancipation Day (Saint Kitts and Nevis)
- Republic Day (Ivory Coast)
- Youth Day (Kiribati)
- National Purple Heart Day (United States)
