= English College =

English College may refer to:

== Educational institutions ==
- Dubai English Speaking College, a British private school in Dubai, Emirates
- English College Dubai, an independent secondary school in Dubai, Emirates
- English College in Prague, a Czecho-British secondary school in Prague, Czechia
- English College Johore Bahru, an old premier school in Johor, Malaysia, also known as Maktab Sultan Abu Bakar
- Stonyhurst College, a coeducational Roman Catholic independent school in Lancashire, United Kingdom which was founded as English Jesuit College at St Omer
- Tallinn English College, a general education school in Tallinn, Estonia
- Türk Maarif Koleji, an influential selective secondary education institute in Nicosia, Northern Cyprus which used the name English College from 1968 to 1973

== Religious institutions ==
- English College of St Gregory, a past Roman Catholic seminary in Seville, Spain, closed in 1767
- English College, Douai, a past Catholic seminary in Douai, France, closed in 1793
- English College, Lisbon, a past Roman Catholic seminary in Lisbon, Portugal, closed in 1973
- English College, Valladolid, a residence and training centre for the training of Catholic priests in Valladolid, Spain
- English College, Rome, a Roman Catholic seminary in Rome, Italy
