= Joseph Creswell =

English Jesuit

Joseph Creswell (real name Arthur) (1557 of Yorkshire stock in London – c. 1623) was an English Jesuit controversialist.

== Life ==
Creswell joined the Society of Jesus at Rome, 11 October 1583, having previously studied at Reims and at the Roman College. Having been rector (1589–1592) after Robert Persons at the English College, Rome, he also succeeded Persons as vice-prefect for the English Jesuit interests in Spain.

Creswell's character and conduct in connection with his difficulties over the seminaries in Seville and Valladolid, and his controversies about the Benedictine vocations have been criticized. Creswell had considerable intercourse with Sir Charles Cornwallis, the English resident at Madrid, till the Gunpowder Plot, when Creswell was summoned to Rome.

Sent to Belgium in 1614, he was at St-Omer in 1620, and in 1621 was made rector of Ghent.

== Works ==
His chief works are:

- A Latin treatise, De Vita Beata
- Exemplar Literarun ad Cecilium (sive Burleigh), 1592, under the pseudonym "John Perne", against Elizabeth's proclamation of 29 November 1591
- Vida y Martyrio del P. Henrique Valpolo (Madrid, 1596)
- A treatise against James I's (1610) proclamation (4to, St-Omer, 1611)
- Meditations upon the Rosary (St-Omer, 1620)
- A translation into Spanish, under the name "Peter Manrique" of William Bathe's Preparation for Administering Penance and the Eucharist (Milan, 1614)
- A translation into English and Spanish, under initials N. T., of Salvian's Quis dives salvus? (St-Omer, 1618)
- Relacion de Inglaterra Ms X, 14, National Library, Madrid
- Memoir for Philip III of Spain on affairs of the Society of Jesus
- Responsio ad Calumnias, Stonyhurst Library, Letters, Vatican archives (Lettere di particolari, I, 1).

== Family ==
His widowed mother married William Lacy, who, after her death, was ordained priest and martyred (22 August 1582) at York.
