= English College, Valladolid =

Seminary for English and Welsh Catholic priests in Valladolid, Spain

Coordinates: 41°39′01″N 4°43′04″W

Royal English College of St Alban
- The façade of the College
- Type: Seminary
- Established: 1589; 437 years ago
- Religious affiliation: Roman Catholic
- Rector: Fr John Flynn
- Location: Valladolid, Spain
- Website: http://www.sanalbano.org/

The Royal English College (Spanish: Real Colegio de Ingleses) is a Catholic seminary in Valladolid, Spain, that trains priests for England and Wales. It is under the patronage of St. Alban. Men of varying ages and backgrounds spend an introductory year in Valladolid to discern their vocation and begin spiritual and human formation. After their year in Valladolid, students typically proceed to seminaries in the United Kingdom, Ireland or Rome.

== History ==
Robert Persons, an English Jesuit priest, founded the College in 1589, during the English Reformation, with the permission of King Philip II of Spain.

The College was run by the Jesuits until their expulsion from Spain in 1767. This created a crisis for the College, which was bereft of faculty and students in one blow. Bishop Richard Challoner, Vicar Apostolic in London, was instrumental in securing the future of the College by amalgamating the three existing English Colleges in Madrid, Seville, and Valladolid, and securing staff from the English Mission and students from the English College at Douai. The College inherited the assets of the English College of St Gregory in Seville: it had been founded by Persons in 1592 and had become bankrupt by 1645.

In 1998, the Catholic Bishops’ Conference of England and Wales endorsed the College as its Propaedeutic Seminary, following the encouragement for such seminaries promulgated by Pope John Paul II in his Pastores dabo vobis (1992). This endorsement established the introductory year of studies and formation at the College.

== Our Lady Vulnerata ==
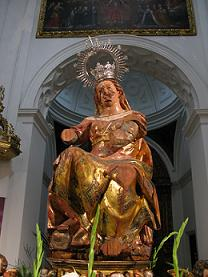
The Vulnerata on a paso before a procession

The image of Our Lady venerated in the College Chapel is that of La Vulnerata, or The Wounded One. The story of the Vulnerata goes back centuries; but in 1596, as Spain was gathering a fleet in the city of Cádiz, the Earl of Essex together with Sir Walter Raleigh led an English fleet into the harbour, defeated the Spanish navy and sacked the city. During the sack of Cádiz, English troops dragged a statue of the Virgin Mother and Child from a church to the market square where they removed both of the statue's arms; all that remained of the child were parts of his tiny feet on his mother’s knee.

The mutilated statue was taken to Madrid, and given a place of honour in a private chapel of a Countess. The priests and seminarians of the English College in Valladolid asked the Countess if they might make reparation for the behaviour of their fellow countrymen who had desecrated the statue. She agreed and the statue was brought to Valladolid and installed with great solemnity in the College Chapel in 1600.

Every year during Holy Week the statue is processed along the street, where it is met by a huge paso or float, which has a large depiction of the Crucified Christ resting on top of it. The two images meet, and dance to each other for a brief period—then the Vulnerata comes back to the College.

== College Martyrs ==
The following alumni of the College were martyred during the Protestant Reformation in England and Wales:

- Saint Ambrose Barlow OSB
- Saint Thomas Garnet SJ
- Saint John Lloyd
- Saint John Plessington
- Saint John Roberts OSB
- Saint Henry Walpole SJ
- Blessed Ralph Ashley SJ
- Blessed Edward Bamber
- Blessed Mark Barkworth OSB
- Blessed Arthur Bell OSF
- Blessed Thomas Benstead
- Blessed Thomas Bullaker OSF
- Blessed Roger Cadwallador
- Blessed Ralph Corby SJ
- Blessed Robert Drury
- Blessed Roger Filcock SJ
- Blessed Thomas Holland SJ
- Blessed Thomas Palaser OSF
- Blessed Thomas Reynolds
- Blessed William Richardson
- Blessed William Southerne
- Blessed Thomas Whitaker
- Venerable Edward Morgan SJ

== See also ==
- English College, Douai
- English College, Rome
- List of Jesuit sites
