= Thomas Reynolds (priest) =

English Reformation Catholic priest

Blessed Thomas Reynolds
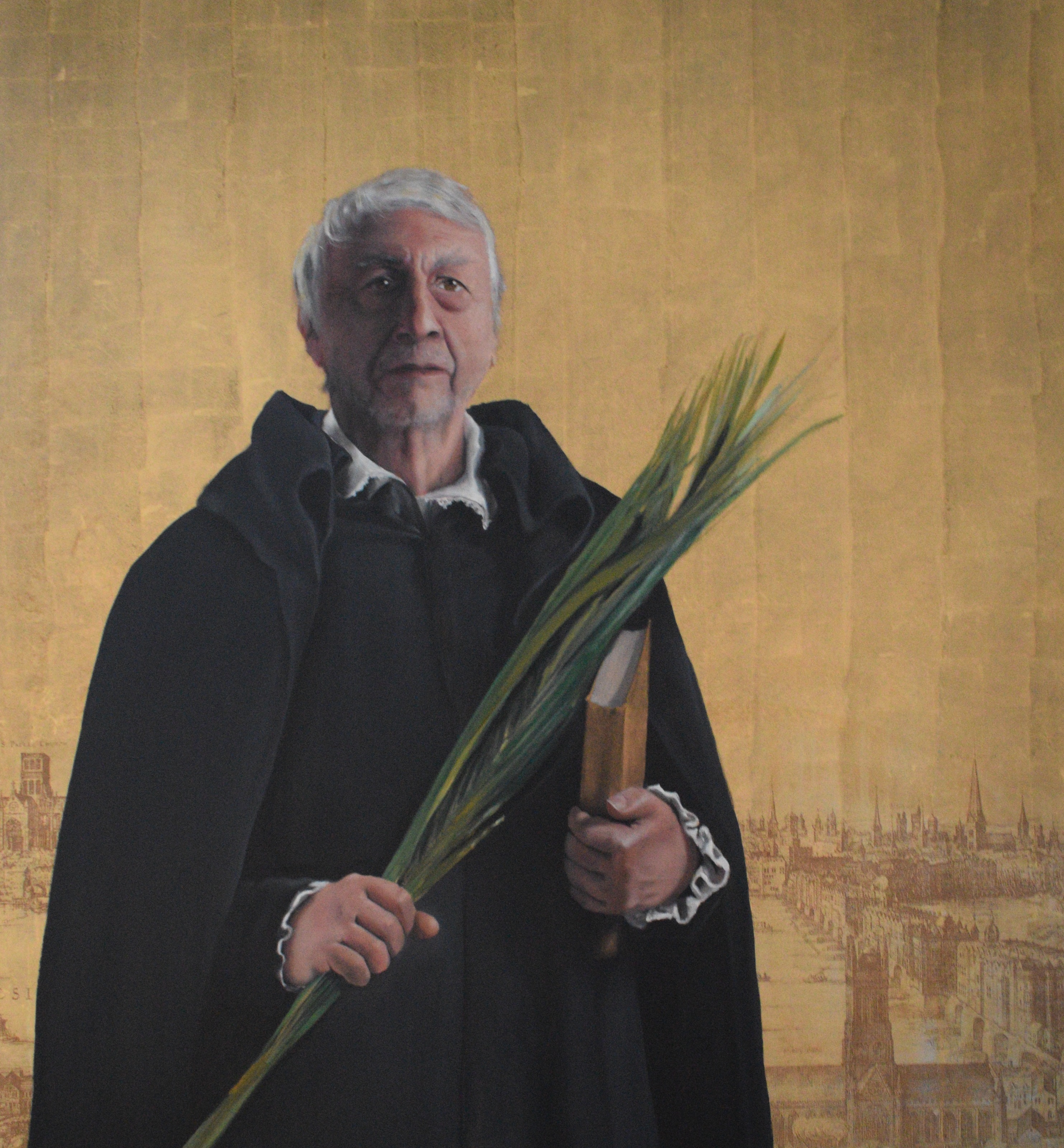
- Painting in English College, Valladolid

Martyr
- Born: c.1562
- Died: 21 January 1642; Tyburn, London, England
- Venerated in: Catholic Church
- Beatified: 15 December 1929, Rome by Pope Pius XI
- Feast: 4 May

Thomas Reynolds (c. 1562 – 21 January 1642), born Thomas Green (possible alias during priestly ministry, Richard Reynolds), was an English Reformation Catholic priest and martyr.

== Early life and ministry ==
Reynolds place of birth is not clear, possibly Warwickshire, more likely Oxfordshire. In keeping with the necessity of the times, he left England to study for the priesthood on the continent, initially going to Reims before continuing his studies from September 1590 in the English College, Valladolid as one of its first students, and finally at another newly founded Jesuit institution, the English College of St Gregory in Seville. He was ordained a priest there in 1592. He made his way to England where he ministered to the Catholic community until his arrest in 1606 in the wave of anti-Catholic measures that were taken following the Gunpowder Plot of November 1605. Whilst the duration of his early years of ministry reflected the slightly less difficult times for Catholics during that period, the Gunpowder Plot changed the atmosphere making it far more hostile. He was one of the priests who were fortunate to just be exiled from England rather than martyred in response to the Plot. He soon returned to England and once more set about ministering to Catholics in secret. This he continued for about twenty years until he was arrested in 1628.

== Imprisonment ==
He was put on trial and condemned to death, but given a reprieve at the behest of the Queen, Henrietta Maria, originally of France, a Catholic. Though imprisoned he was kept under relatively mild conditions which included being allowed to receive visitors readily. Because of that, many Catholics visited him, not only to offer him care and support but also for his spiritual guidance and the sacraments. In 1635 he was one of a number of priests who would pay a bond and then be released from prison, which allowed him to minister to the local Catholic population in London on a regular basis. With the Crown at that time having Catholic sympathies and the rather more anti-Catholic feelings of Parliamentarians being diffused due to Parliament's long suspension, this was a period when the pressures on Catholics were eased. It was due to this that a number of priests were able to act in a similar manner to Reynolds.

== Trial and execution ==
The financial needs of King Charles I forced him to recall Parliament in 1640. At this time Parliament was increasingly being dominated by Puritans who were hostile to Catholicism. As a result, conditions for Catholics and priests became far more difficult with priests once more being confined full time to their prisons. The trials and death sentences for priests resumed and one of the early victims of this was Reynolds. With the King having to flee London in early January 1642 following his failure to capture the leaders of the Parliamentary actions against him, the capital was left in control of the Parliamentarians. It was at this time that Alban Roe was tried and condemned to be executed by being hung, drawn and quartered together with Reynolds. Now eighty years of age, by nature a slightly timid person and being somewhat infirm, Reynolds admitted his fears of facing execution and how he would be able to manage the ordeal he was soon to undergo. He spent his final couple of days in prayer and asking for the prayers of his fellow priests imprisoned with him.

On the morning of his execution, 21 January 1642 (January 31 in the reformed calendar), he found that he had a sense of serenity that he could manage what lay ahead, and using supplies that had been brought to him in prison he said Mass, before being summoned to his execution. After being drawn on hurdles with Roe from Newgate Prison in London to Tyburn, he addressed the assembled crowd for nearly half-an-hour. He pointed out that in forty years work as a priest in England, no one could testify to him having ever uttered a word of treason and that his sole aim had been to ‘reduce strayed souls to the fold of the Catholic Church’. He added that he had no desire to criticise or meddle with the actions of Parliament, but rather that God would bless them and teach them what to do best for the kingdom; he extended his prayers to the King and Queen and all the Kingdom which he hoped would flourish. He concluded by asking forgiveness of all he had offended and granting forgiveness to any who sought it for actions against him, particularly in regard to his death. Turning to the sheriff overseeing the execution, he specifically thanked him and for his patience whilst he addressed the crowd and prayed that God would reward him for that by one day making him a saint in heaven. The sheriff in turn commended himself to Reynolds and was heard to remark to one of those present with him that he had never seen a man die like him. Having finished his address, Reynolds knelt to pray. He and Roe were placed in the cart, embraced one another, then recited the Miserere Psalm in turn till the cart was pulled away. The sheriff allowed the martyrs to hang till they expired to spare them the suffering of being drawn and quartered which he only carried out after they were dead. Catholics amongst the crowd, of which there were found to be many, came forwards to dip cloths in their blood to provide relics for veneration.

Thomas Reynolds was beatified by Pope Pius XI on 15 December 1929, therefore he is among the group of One Hundred and Seven Martyrs of England and Wales.
