= Adabina =

Ethiopian traditional youth celebration

Adabina (Amharic : አዳብና) is a traditional Ethiopian youth celebration observed among the Gurage people, particularly the Kistane and Dobi Gurage community. The name is derived from Adam and Eve, symbolizing the beginning of humanity and, by extension, new beginnings for young people.

This annual event is celebrated during Meskel festival season from September 16th till Oct 5th in the Ethiopian calendar, bringing together young people and the community in an atmosphere of joy, hope and togetherness.

Adabina is a social and cultural event where young people gather to celebrate community, socialize, and often seek potential marriage partners. The event traditionally takes place during Meskel seasons and is associated with singing, dancing, and other communal activities.

== Etymology ==
The word Adabina is believed to come from a combination of Adam Ena hēwani (Amharic : አዳምና ሄዋን), referring to Adam and Eve. This etymology reflects the symbolic connection between the event and the origin of human relationships.

Adabina represents one of the long-standing cultural institutions maintained under the customary laws of the Gordena Sera, spanning several centuries. According to local tradition, there are two main explanations for the name's etymology. One interpretation links it to “Adam and Eve” (Adamna Hewan in Ge'ez), shortened locally to Adamna, reflecting the way young men and women interact and engage with one another during the festival, symbolizing the bond of the first couple. Another explanation connects the term to the words Adey and Bina - Adey referring to the native yellow flower that blooms around the Ethiopian New Year in September, and Bina meaning “bright day.” This version associates the festival with the change of seasons and the renewal marked by this time of year.

== Background ==
Adabina is typically celebrated one week after Meskel. In certain areas, however, it may begin earlier, as some localities traditionally observe it on a fixed date unique to that area. For example, the festivities of Adabina are commonly attributed to start at the district of Anati, north of Bui.

Adabina is typically celebrated in two types of settings: at a large marketplace or field, and close to a local parish. At marketplaces, non-Soddo/Dobi fellow Gurages or other ethnic groups adjacent to these areas who frequent these markets may also join and celebrate. This is most evident at Kela, Dobi, and Acheber Gebeyas. Adabina is also where the "Muyet" people, a marginalized group with their own language, can freely participate in celebrations and display their culture.

Popular places widely renowned for Adabina celebrations include Kela on Saturday, Anati Kidanemihret on Meskerem 16, Gefersa Giyorgis on Meskerem 17, Damu Genet on Thursday Meskerem 21, and Dobi Gebeya on Monday in Meskerem 19, among others. The festivities of Adabina typically last for approximately three weeks. Although they are observed on different dates across various districts, the celebration officially concludes on Tikimt 5 (October 15) with the feast day of St. Gebremenfes Kidus, which is celebrated at Midre Kebd Abo—the patron saint of the Kistane.

=== Popular areas where Adabina is celebrated ===
==== Churches ====
- Gereno Selassie
- Gefersa Giyorgis
- Anati Kidanemihret
- Genet Mariam
- Tiya Mariam
- Welenshu Medhanealem

==== Markets and fields ====
- Kela Kidame Gebeya (Saturday)
- Suten Gebeya
- Adele Arb Gebeya (Friday)
- Dachi Hamus Gebeya (Thursday)
- Aymellel Yitene Meda
- Fato Meda
- Keshet Erob Gebeya (Wednesday)
- Acheber Arb Gebeya (Friday)
- Jole Qechey
- Rifenso Ketema
- Damu Erob Ketema (Wednesday)
- Wegeram Keti Meda & Koratuni
- Dobi Segno Gebeya (Monday)
- Welenshu Segno Gebeya (Monday)
- Sost Amba (Weynamba) Hamus Gebeya (Thursday)
- Kechinamba Wertebo
- Segenet Gebeya
- Lemamer Gebeya
- Goga Chefiye
- Argume Cherchera Gebeya (Thursday)
- Zebidar Arb Gebeya (Friday)

== Festives ==
Adabina is often referred to synonymously as "Yemetechacha K’en", or “courtship day.” Among the various festivities, one of the most distinctive customs involves a courtship ritual during the dancing. Young girls, wearing the traditional Shiruba, Tirimbo, or Merti hairstyles, will dance and sing traditional songs. Young men express their interest by tossing a lemon or candy toward a young woman they are interested in courting. If the girl picks it up, this gesture is understood as a sign of acceptance. Following this, the young man sends his friends and relatives to visit the girl’s parents to formally inquire about marriage, similar to the customs observed during Timket (Epiphany).

Common games played include

- Nejo Arajo
- Saba
- Agati Zelay
- Ye Bitir Zila

== During Adabina ==
- Youth participate in traditional dances, songs and sports games
- Wear cultural clothing, often showcasing Gurage woven outfits
- Use the occasion to form social connections that may lead to future marriages

== Cultural significance ==
Adabina is regarded as an important rite of passage, allowing young people to interact under the guidance of community elders. It strengthens cultural identity and reinforces traditional values of hospitality, respect, and unity.

== Regional variations ==
Though widely celebrated among the Gurage, similar youth gatherings exist among other Ethiopian communities, each with their own name and customs such as Ashenda, Shadaye and others.
