= Filseta =

Ethiopian and Eritrean Orthodox Tewahedo Church feast day

Filseta ፍልሰታ
- The apostles witnessing the Dormition of Saint Mary
- Official name: ጾመ-ፍልሰታ, Ṣomä-Fəlsäta
- Observed by: Eritrean Orthodox Tewahedo Church; Eritrean Catholic Church; Ethiopian Orthodox Tewahedo Church; Ethiopian Catholic Church
- Type: Christian feast day
- Significance: Assumption of Mary; Dormition of the Mother of God
- Begins: 7 August
- Ends: 22 August
- Duration: 15 days
- Frequency: Annual

Filseta (Ge'ez: ፍልሰታ, romanized: Fəlsäta, lit. 'Movement', i.e. 'Assumption') is a feast day observed by the Ethiopian Orthodox Tewahedo Church and Eritrean Orthodox Tewahedo Church (as well as the Ethiopian Catholic Church and the Eritrean Catholic Church) in commemoration of the Dormition and Assumption of Mary. The fasting and liturgy extends for two weeks starting from 7 August to 22 August. Divine liturgy is conducted during all the days of the fast culminating in the final liturgy on the 15th day revering Saint Mary.

== History ==
=== Dormition ===
In accordance with Tewahedo Church teachings Dormition is the belief that Saint Mary's death was without suffering, in a state of spiritual peace. The Dormition of the Mother of God was believed to have been witnessed by the Apostles. After the death of Saint Mary the Apostles wanted to bury her body in the garden of Gethsemane. It is believed that this is when Jewish authorities at the time intervened and would not allow the Apostles to bury her body in fear of another resurrection like that of her Son, Jesus Christ. It was at this time that the Angels accompanied by John the Apostle had taken Saint Mary's body to be buried under the Tree of Life. Upon his return the other Apostles asked John what he had witnessed there to which he replied by telling them about Saint Mary's burial beneath the Tree of Life. The other Apostles having not witnessed this personally decided to pray and fast for 15 days in order for God to reveal the place where Saint Mary's body had been buried. After their fast the Angel of God brought her body to the Apostles allowing them to bury her on a Sunday.

=== The Story of Filseta ===
It is believed that on Tuesday, the third day after Saint Mary was buried, her body was resurrected and taken to Heaven as part of the Assumption of Mary. Only one of the Apostles, St. Thomas, had not witnessed this burial as he was stationed at the apostolic dioceses in India at the time. It was believed that he was taken by a cloud to witness the Assumption. As he was on his journey he met Saint Mary during her ascension, thinking he had missed the event he asked the Virgin Mary, "I did not see the resurrection of your Son; nor was I to witness yours, How sinful I am?" to which The Virgin Mary answered saying "Do not be sorry; the others did not see my resurrection and ascension, but you have." She gave St. Thomas a significant piece of garment known as mägnäz (መግነዝ) or säbän (ሰበን) in Ge'ez, a sign representing her glory and honor. (Priests of the Ethiopian church usually cover their hand-held crosses with a cloth to remember the säbän St. Thomas received from Saint Mary.) She told St. Thomas to tell the other Apostles what he had seen when he reached them. Later when St. Thomas met the other Apostles and heard their accounts and witnessed the empty tomb of Saint Mary, he told them his account of the Assumption of Mary.

Upon hearing St. Thomas's account, the other Apostles wanted to have their own first-hand account of the Assumption of Mary. One year after their encounter with St. Thomas the other Apostles decided to hold a 15-day fast starting from 7 August and ending on 22 August. On the 15th day of fasting the Apostles were visited by Saint Mary and her son, Jesus Christ. Divine liturgy was conducted on that day by Jesus Christ himself designating St. Peter as assistant priest and Deacon Stephen (who descended from Heaven for the event) as an archdeacon. At the end of the divine liturgy Jesus Christ gave the Apostles holy communion, after which he ordered the Apostles to preach and witness the Resurrection and Assumption of his mother Saint Mary throughout the world.

== Historical evidence ==
While the exact date is debated among different Churches the author Hippolytus of Thebes claimed as part of his chronology to the New Testament that Saint Mary lived for 11 years after the resurrection of Jesus, dying in AD 41.

== Pilgrimage ==
Pilgrimages are made to monasteries named after Saint Mary during this two week fast. Pilgrims go to these monasteries and camp out on the compound following a strict set of rules.

- No outside food is allowed in the monastery. The only thing that followers are allowed to consume is water and handful of cereals during the evening hours of the day.
- Pilgrims are to collectively pray multiple times during each day of fasting (Divine Liturgy (Kidase) - 2.5 hours, Seatat- 6 hours, Kidan-1 hour, Serk-30 minutes, plus any additional personal prayers) for at least 10 hours.
- Pilgrims are to not communicate with the outside world. (some also take a vow of silence the two weeks only communicating through writing).

It is believed that the pilgrims will cleanse themselves of sins during this pilgrimage having their prayers answered after the end of the two weeks.

== Ashenda ==
Ashenda is a cultural festival celebrated in August in Tigray, Amhara and to a lesser extent Eritrea to commemorate the end of the two-week-long Filseta fast. Traditionally every year girls come together in groups wearing traditional clothing singing and beating drums to celebrate the occasion.

== See also ==
- Assumption of Mary
- Dormition of the Mother of God
