= William Southerne =

English Roman Catholic priest and martyr

Blessed William Southerne
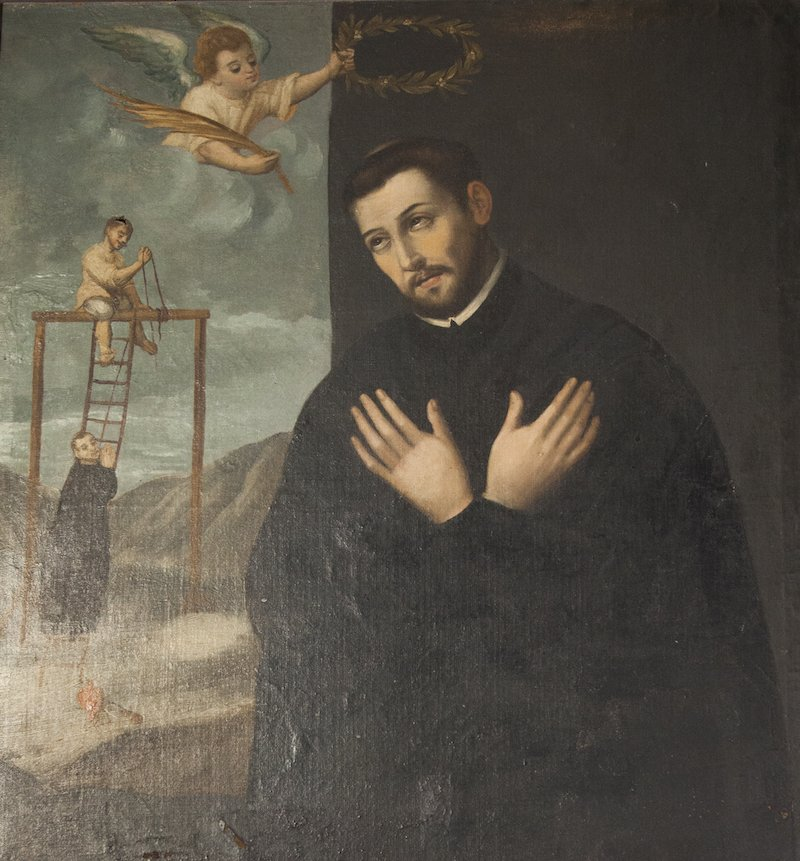
- Portrait in the Royal English College in Valladolid

Priest and Martyr
- Born: c. 1569; Ketton, near Darlington, County Durham, England
- Died: 30 April 1618 (aged 48 - 49); Newcastle-upon-Tyne, England
- Venerated in: Roman Catholic Church
- Beatified: 22 November 1987 by Pope John Paul II
- Feast: 30 April, 22 November, 29 October

William Southerne (executed at Newcastle-upon-Tyne, 30 April 1618) was an English Roman Catholic priest. He is a Catholic martyr, beatified in 1987.

== Life ==
An alumnus and priest of the English College at Douai and the Royal English College, Valladolid, he was born at Ketton, near Darlington, County Durham, and ministered in Northumberland. He was sentenced to death for being a Catholic priest and refusing to take the oath of allegiance and was stripped, hung, drawn and quartered.

Some later accounts, such as Challoner's Missionary Priests (1741-2), give the place of execution as Newcastle-under-Lyme but they appear to confuse Blessed William Southerne with another priest of a similar name who ministered at Baswich, near Stafford, which then belonged to a branch of the Fowler family.
