= Standish Hall =

Former country house and estate in Standish, Wigan

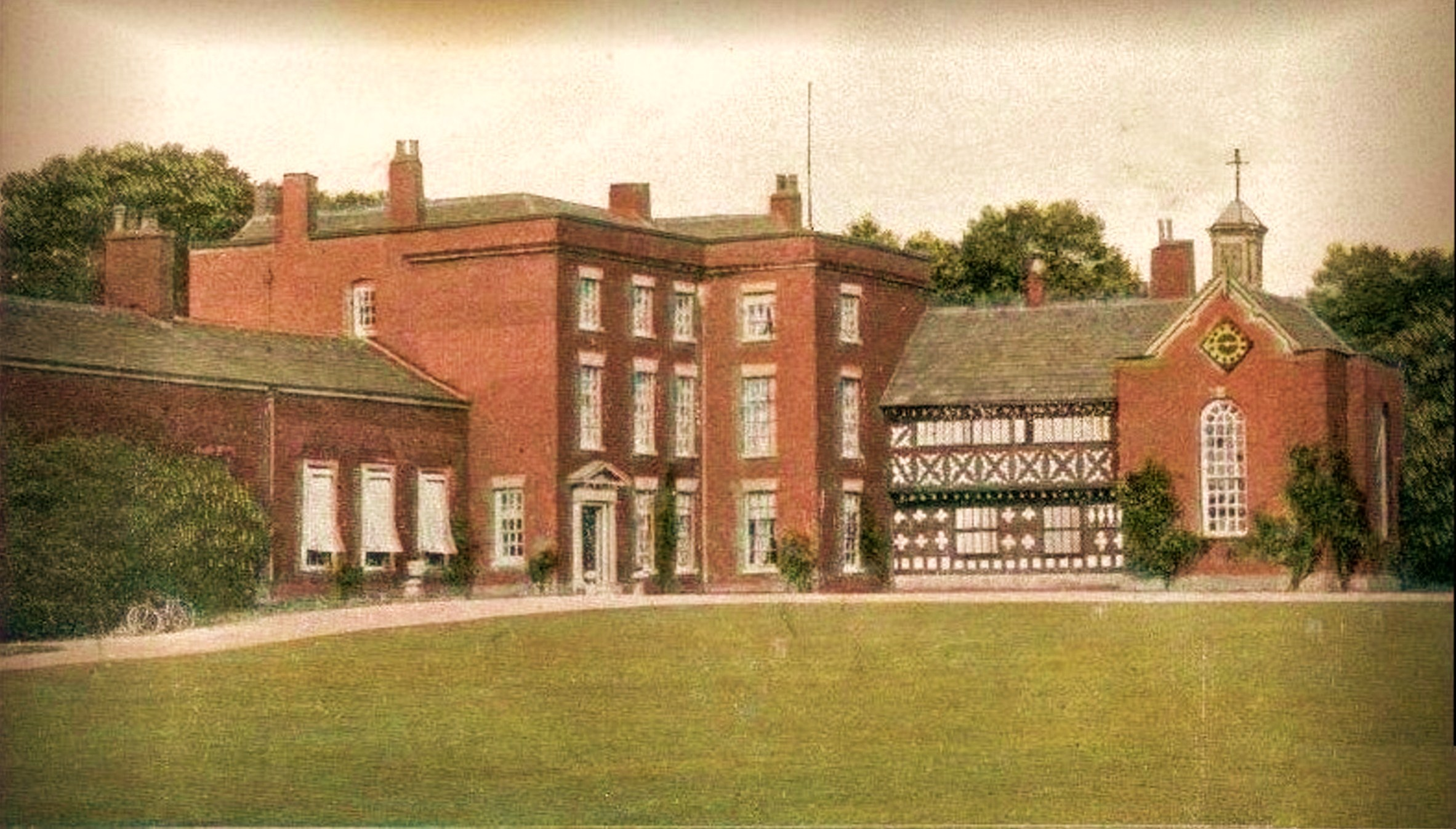
- Postcard of Standish Hall c. 1915
- Interactive map of the Standish Hall area

General information
- Location: Standish, Greater Manchester, England
- Coordinates: 53°34′26″N 2°40′08″W
- Construction started: 1573

Standish Hall was an estate and country house, built in 1573, owned by the Standish family in the south-west of Standish, Wigan. No standing structures of the hall remain on the former estate, however, some of its wooden-panel interiors have been preserved elsewhere.

== History ==
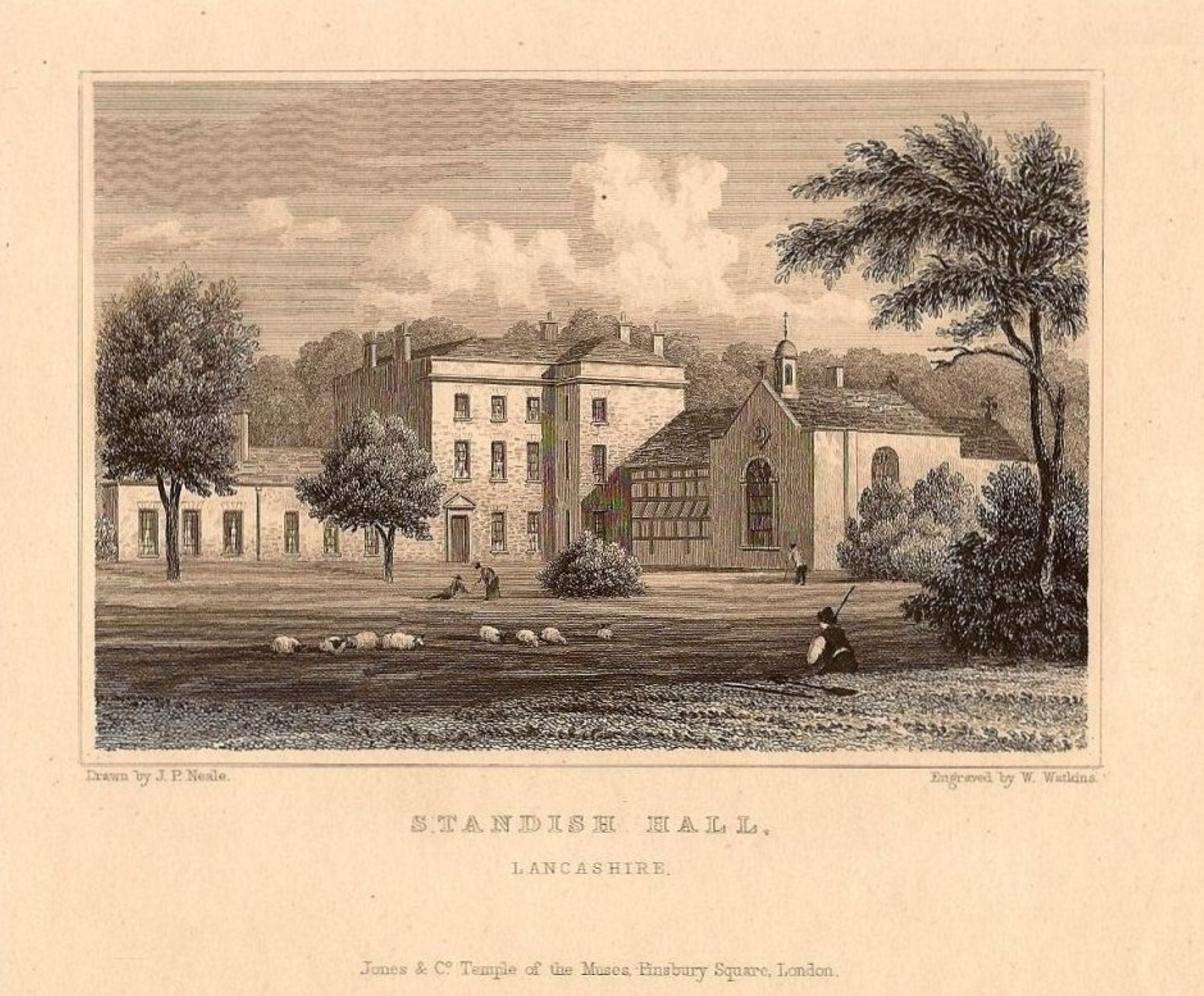
Drawing of Standish Hall, by John Preston Neale c. 1845

The original hall was constructed in 1574 and consisted of a wattle and daub H-shaped building. In 1684, a northern wing built of brick was added; during the same period, many alterations were made to the original house. In 1748, a three-story western wing was added, also built out of brick. The hall was surrounded by a moat until 1780, when it was filled in. A final extension to the hall further to the west was added in 1822.

By the late 19th century, Standish Hall stood in extensive parkland with forests, grasslands and large fishponds. The hall and its Roman Catholic chapel were at the centre of the estate, which had a series of interconnecting paths and possibly a ha-ha to the south. A track to the north led to the Hermitage.

The last member of the Standish family to live in the hall was Charles Strickland Standish. After he left the hall, he later let it to Thomas Darwell, the Mayor of Wigan, in 1824 or 1825. The estate was then leased to several tenants by the Standish Family over the years, including Nathaniel Eckersley, who died there in 1892.

The last lord of the Standish manor was Henry Noailles Widdrington Standish, who died in 1920, leaving no heirs. He was brought up in France and never lived in the Hall. The estate was broken up and put up for auction in 1921 by its then-owner, James Birkett Almond. However, the hall failed to reach its reserve price of £4,800, and so was withdrawn. In 1923, the Chappel and Tudor Hall were demolished, and the remainder was left in ruin. The last standing part of the hall, split up into two smaller houses during the 20th century, was demolished around 1982, when the National Coal Board acquired the land.

=== Preservation of interiors ===
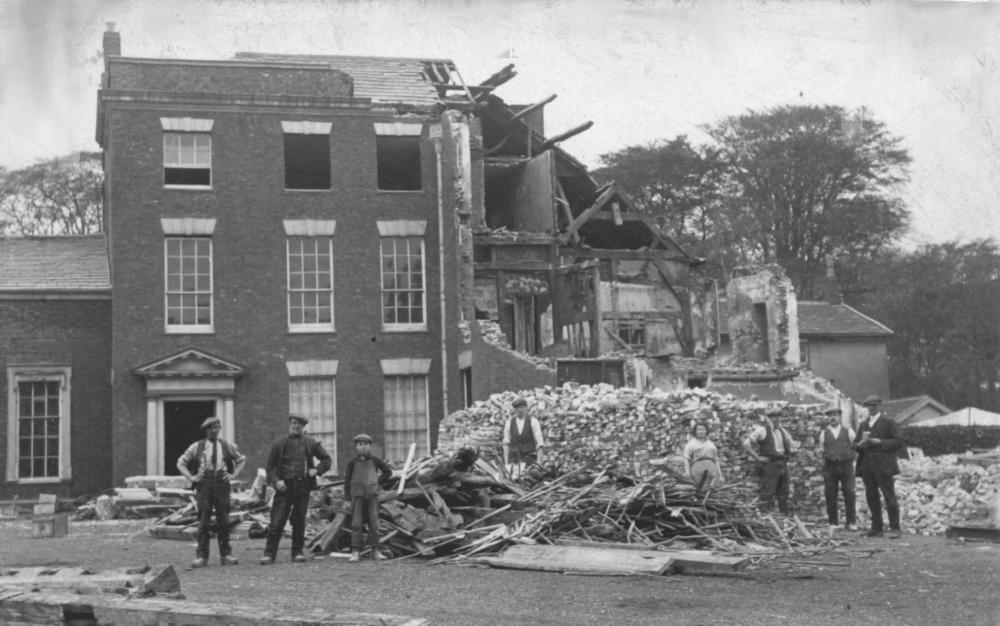
Demolition of part of the hall in 1923 after the removal of the interiors

While no standing sections of the hall remain, four wood-panelled interiors survive, three of which were transported to the U.S., with one remaining in England. The Jacobean drawing room and Elizabethan study (originally from Borwick Hall) were bought by William Randolph Hearst and shipped to New York in the 1930s. The study was later donated to the Detroit Institute of Arts, where it remains in storage as of 2020. The drawing room was later bought by Tony Hulman and installed in the Lingen Lodge, which is now used by the Rose–Hulman Institute of Technology. The library was bought by Ralph H. Booth in 1922 and incorporated into his mansion in Grosse Pointe, Detroit. The dining room was bought in 1924 and moved to Halsway Manor in Somerset.

The locations of the preserved interiors were rediscovered in 2020 through research undertaken by local historians.

== Catholicism ==
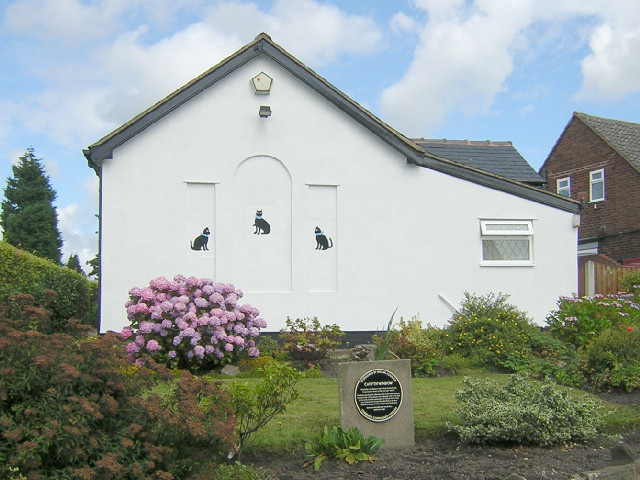
Cat 'i'th' Window Cottage

Catholic mass was said at Standish Hall from 1559, during the English Reformation, and some of the chaplains who served the Standish Family included Laurence Vaux and Edward Bamber. In 1694, the Hall was suspected to be a centre for Jacobitism, and many of the local Catholic gentry were put on trial for their beliefs. During the Jacobite rising of 1715, Ralph Standish joined the Scots Army and fought at the Battle of Preston. Due to his actions against the crown, he was sentenced to death, though he was later reprieved. In 1742 a new chapel was built on the estate, and for nearly half of the 19th century it was served by Benedictines.

The nearby Cat 'i'th' Window Cottage is associated with the Hall. According to local tradition, black plaster cats placed in its windows served as discreet signals: their position indicated either that a Catholic Mass was being held there or that government troops were in the area.
