= Standish family =

English gentry family

The Standish family is an ancient English feudal manorial family and one of the oldest Anglo-Norman noble lineages. This Norman-rooted family has been settled in Lancashire since the Conquest of England in 1066. The recorded history of the Standish family begins at the end of the 12th century.

== Lords of the Manor of Standish ==
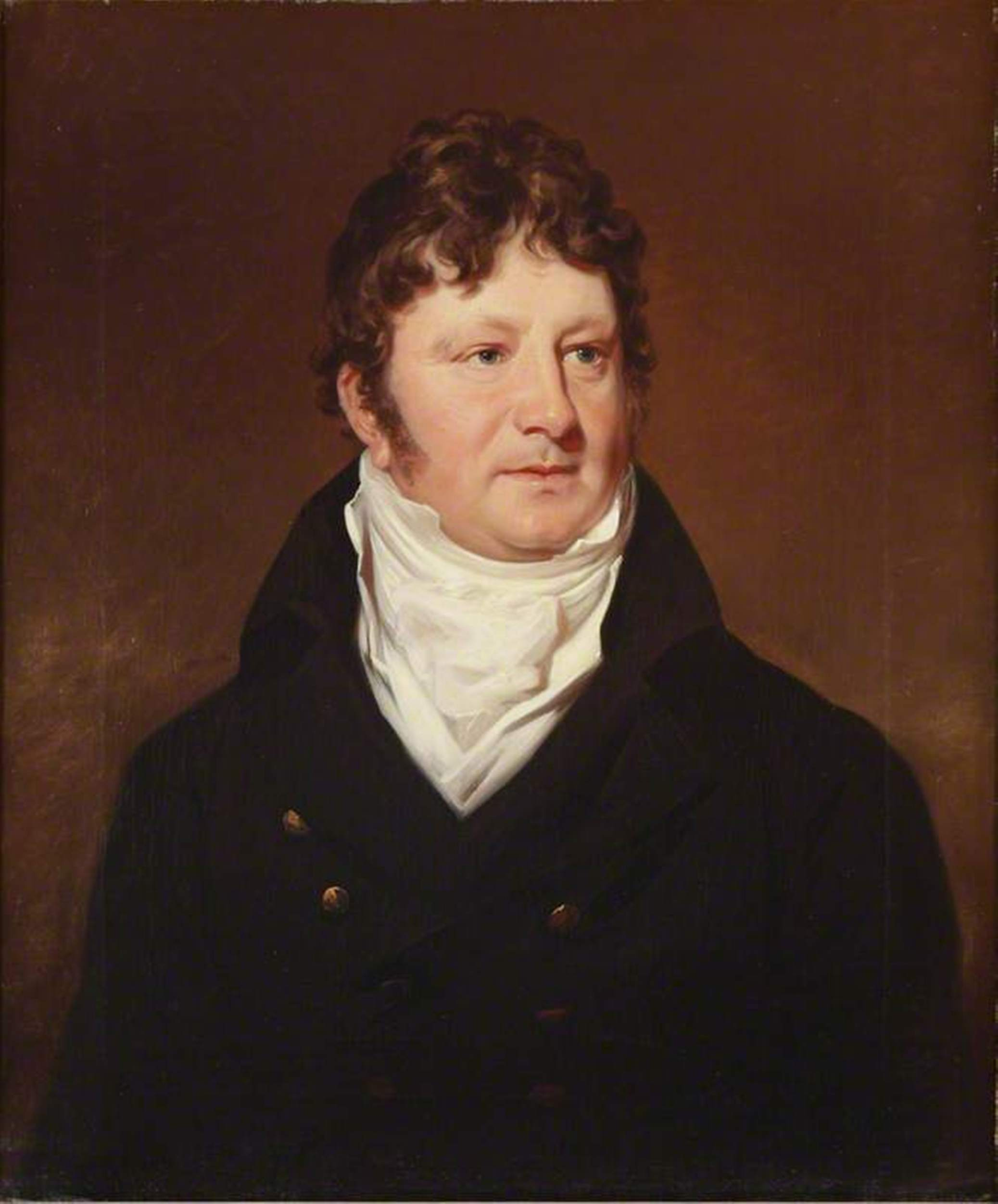
Portrait of Thomas Strickland Standish (1763–1813) by Joseph Allen.

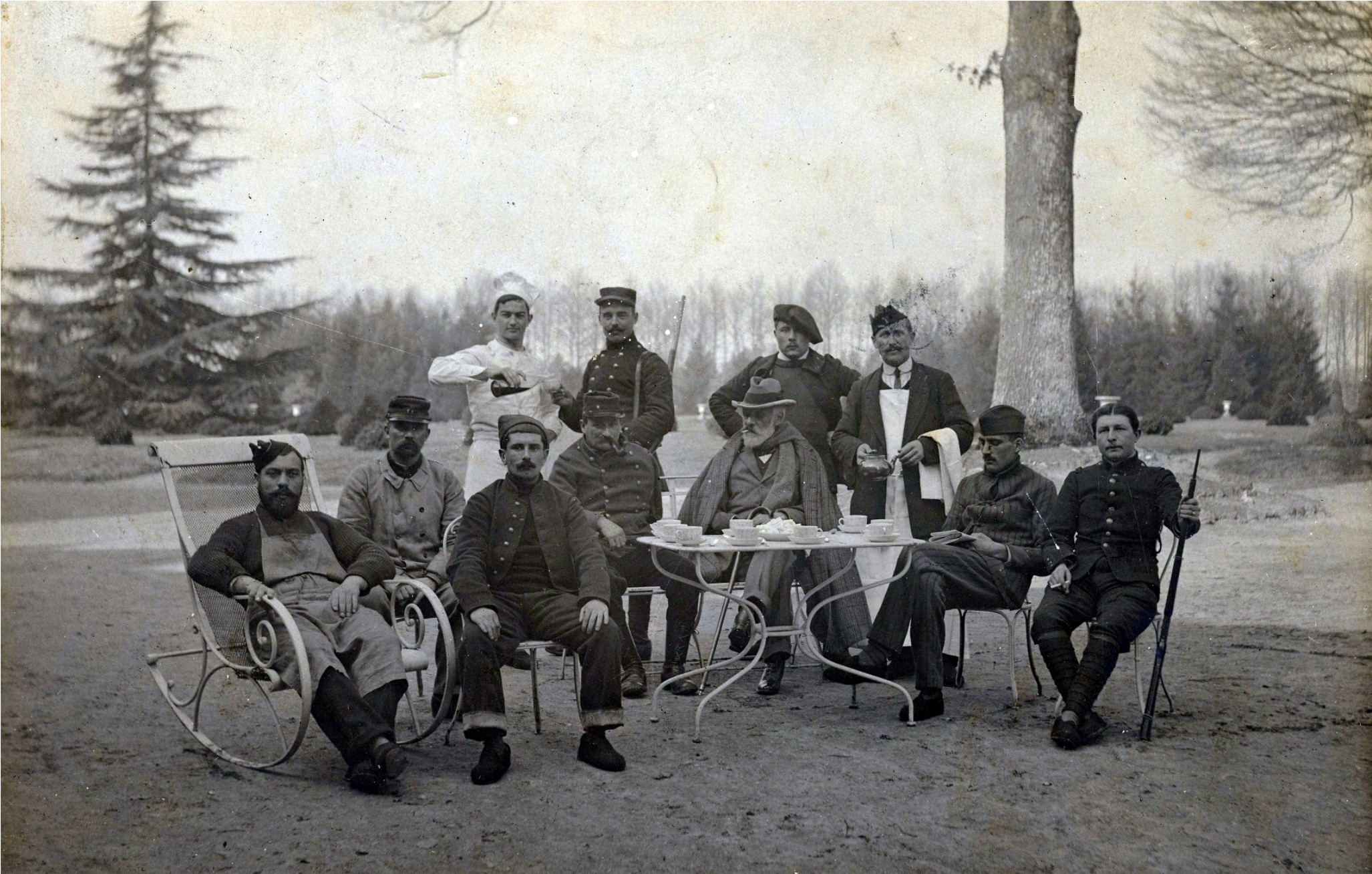
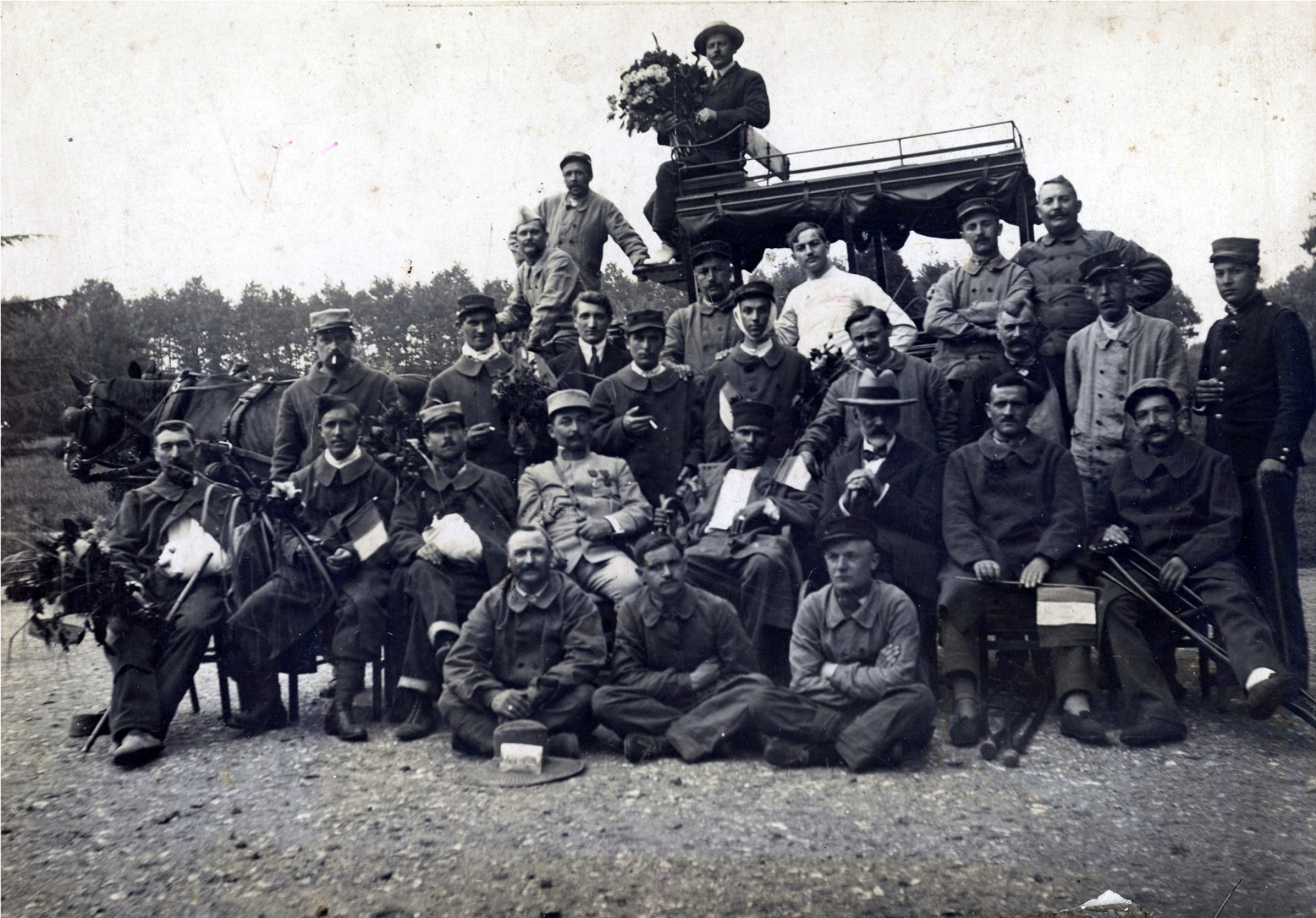
Henry Noailles Widdrington Standish, Lord of the manor of Standish, and his brothers in arms in the château de Montjoye (Clairefontaine-en-Yvelines), during the First World War (1915).

The ancestors of the Standish family lived in Standish, a parish (St Wilfrid) within the unions of Wigan and Chorley. According to the English historian John Whitaker, Standish—anciently Stanedich—was one of the twelve considerable towns in the south of Lancashire. Of the castle of Standish (a former fortified structure believed to have been erected by the Saxons), there are no surviving remains, nor can its exact site be ascertained. Furthermore, it is not known whether the progenitors of the Standish family gave their name to the parish or received it from the castle.

Members of the Standish family, who were Lords of the Manor of Standish and custodians of the Standish estates in Lancashire, are listed below. Standish Hall—a large brick mansion—served as the long-time seat of the family.

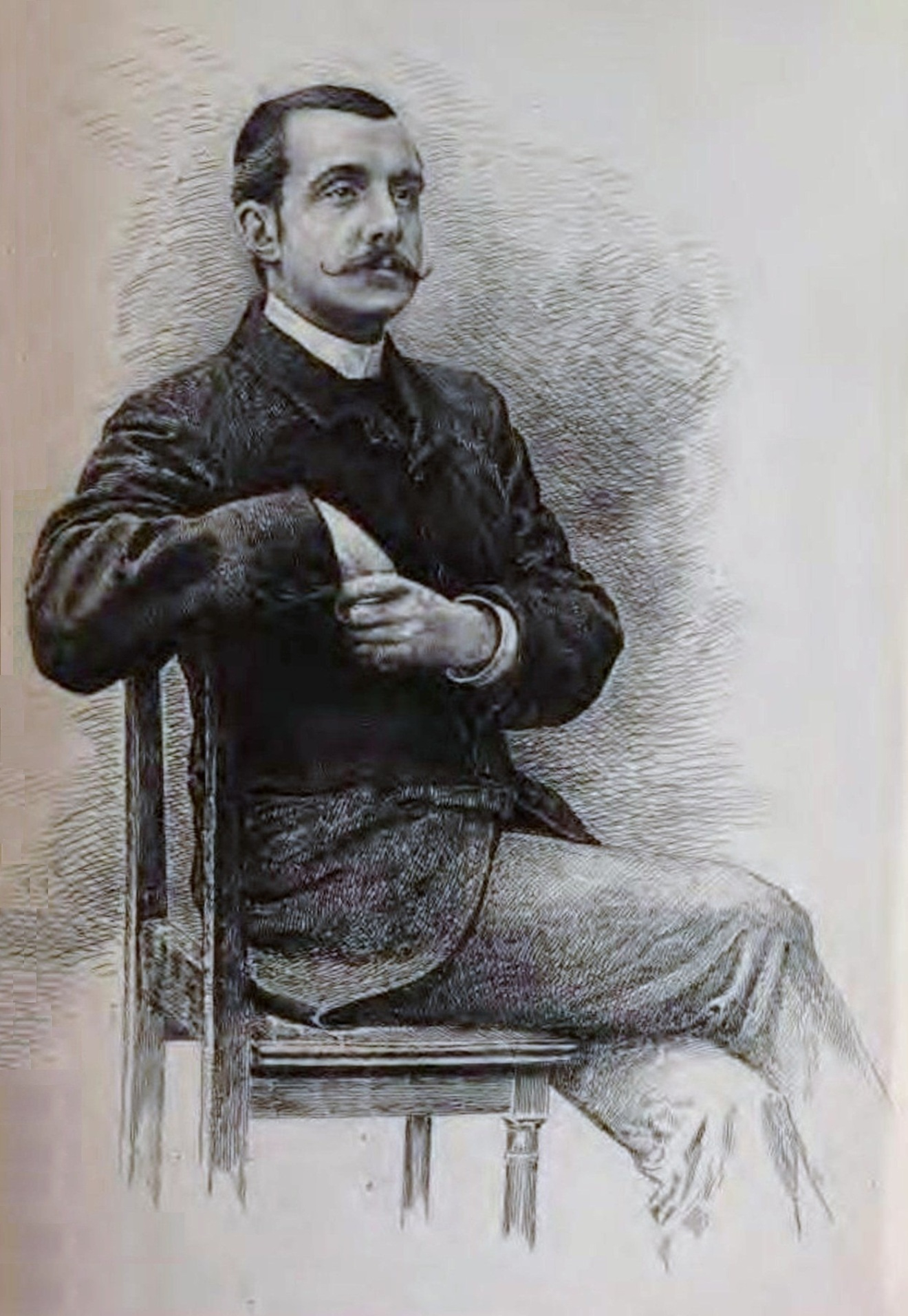
Cecil Marie Roger Widdrington Standish of Standish (1852–1891), brother of Henry Standish, Esq.

Lordish	Personage	Notes
1202?–1220	Radulphus de Stanedis	First Lord of the Manor
1220–1240	Alexander de Standedis	
1240–1246	Radulphus de Standish (II)	
1246–?	Edmund de Standish	Son of Radulphus
?–1270?	Hugh de Standish	Son of Radulphus
1270?–1290	Jordan de Standish	Son of Radulphus
1290–1296	Radulphus de Standish (III)	
1296–1326	William de Standish	
1326–1353	John de Standish	
1353–1396	Henry de Standish	
1396–1418	Ralph de Standish (IV)	
1418–1434	Lawrence de Standish	
1434–1445	Alexander de Standish (II)	
1445–1468	Ralph Standish (V)	
1468–1507	Alexander Standish (III)	
1507–1538	Ralph Standish (VI)	
1538–1539	Alexander Standish (IV)	
1539–1546	Ralph Standish (VII)	Under wardship
1547–1610	Edward Standish	Under wardship 1547–1551
1610–1656	Ralph Standish (VIII)	
1656–1682	Edward Standish (II)	
1682–1705	William Standish (II)	
1705–1755	Ralph Standish (IX)	Last male-line heir
1755–1778	Cecilia Towneley, née Standish	Granddaughter of Henry Howard, 6th Duke of Norfolk
1778–1807	Edward Towneley Standish, né Towneley	Son of Cecilia Standish and William Towneley (himself grandson of William Widdrington, 3rd Baron Widdrington). This elder brother was Charles Townley
1807–1813	Thomas Strickland Standish, né Strickland	Maternal nephew of Edward Towneley Standish
1813–1863	Charles Strickland Standish	
1863–1883	Charles Henry Lionel Widdrington Standish	m.(1) 1846 Sabine de Noailles, daughter of Just de Noailles, Prince of Poix and Duke of Mouchy (2) 1870 Louise Florence Courteille
1883–1920	Henry Noailles Widdrington Standish	Last Lord of the Manor, m. 1870 Hélène de Pérusse des Cars, granddaughter of Amédée de Pérusse des Cars, Duke of Cars (no children)

== Other family members ==
Radulphus de Stanedis, of Duxbury Manor (a Lancashire squire at the beginning of the 13th century).

== See also ==
- Myles Standish
- Frederick Standish
- Berystede
- Hélène Standish (in French)
