= Francis Fenwick =

Francis Fenwick, D.D. (1645–1694), was an English Benedictine monk.

Fenwick was born in London in 1645, entered the convent of St. Edmund, Paris, where he was professed 1 November 1664. He was created a doctor of the Sorbonne, and afterwards elected prior of St. Edmund's in 1689. He was an eloquent preacher and in great repute with James II, who sent him as his agent to the court of Rome. Afterwards the general chapter of the order appointed him abbot-president of the college of St. Gregory at Rome. He died in that city on 30 October 1694, and was buried in the chapel of the English College.
