= Berystede =

Hotel in South Ascot

Coordinates: 51°23′42″N 0°39′41″W

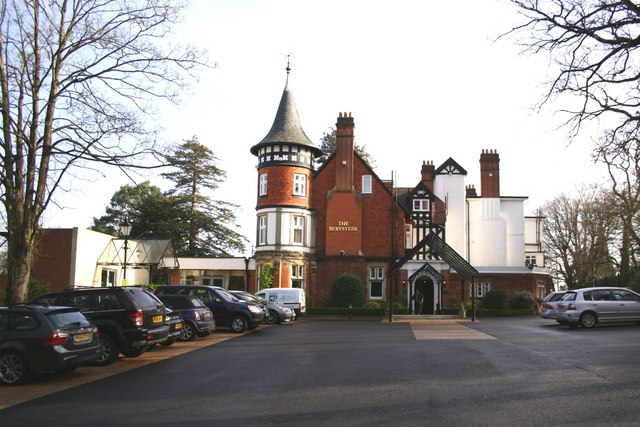
- The Berystede Hotel
- Interactive map of the Berystede area

General information
- Location: South Ascot, Berkshire, England

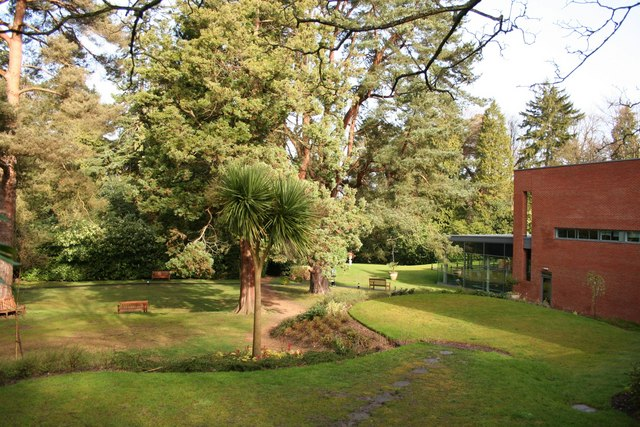
Hotel gardens

The Berystede is a hotel in the village of South Ascot, Berkshire, England.

== History ==
The Berystede site was originally part of the parish of Sunninghill. There are a number of Bronze Age barrows in the district, and the course of the great Roman road, the Devil's Highway crosses the Bagshot-Sunninghill road near Little Stream.

By the end of the 18th century, the original manor had been divided to provide land for the large houses which were clustering around fashionable Windsor. In the 19th century the Berystede site, shown as rough pasture-land on contemporary maps, belonged to the Murray family.

In the 1870s the 10th Lord Elibank leased over 30 acres (12 ha) of land to the Standish family who built the original Bery Stede. At the end of the 19th century Sunninghill parish was divided and Berystede became part of the newly created parish of South Ascot.

=== The Standish family and the original Berystede ===
In 1870, the 23-year-old Henry Noailles Widdrington Standish married Hélène de Pérusse des Cars, daughter of the French Comte des Cars. The couple had estates in both England and France, but their close friendship with the Prince and Princess of Wales (later King Edward VII and Alexandra of Denmark) made a country house within easy reach of London and Windsor essential.

The choice of site was probably influenced by their friendship with the Barnetts who lived at Kings Beeches on the eastern side of Bagshot Road. The original building would have looked like the core of the present hotel, its Gothic Tudor mix of styles the height of Victorian fashion. The choice of the name 'Bery Stede' (then two words) was appropriate as the land is shown as pasture on earlier maps. The old English word bere indicates corn or pasture land and stede means the site of a dwelling.

Berystede Lodge, standing at the Brockenhurst Road entrance, was the home of the head gardener. The stables, now the garage, housed grooms, footmen, coachmen, horses and carriages.

=== The Fire ===
The original house was destroyed by fire in the early hours of 27 October 1886. Eliza Kleininger, Mrs. Standish's maid, died in the fire. There was little that could have been done to save the house; the nearest fire services were several miles away at Windsor, Egham, and Staines, and both messenger and appliance were horse-drawn. By the morning only the walls of the house remained. The Prince of Wales, the future Edward VII, came over from Windsor to see the ruins and express sympathy to the owners.

=== Rebuilding and conversion into a hotel ===
After the fire, the land reverted to the Elibanks and remained derelict for some years, but towards the end of the century the ruins were rebuilt and Berystede was converted into a hotel. The management of the hotel during this period was in the hands of Miss Halford and Miss Hancock. In 1913 Horace Myers took over the management and remained in charge until 1930.

=== Nineteen twenties and thirties ===
The Chaplain family bought the hotel in 1920. The hotel suffered another disastrous fire in the early 1930s, after which slight additions to the structure were made and the hotel was refurbished and modernised. An entry in Kelly's Directory for 1931 states that the hotel was 'now rebuilt and re-equipped to meet the high standards of modem luxury; two hard and two grass tennis courts, 30 acres (12 ha) of woodland and heated lock-up garages'.

Trust Houses Ltd. acquired the hotel in 1937 with 14 acres (5.7 ha) of ground and although some land was later sold, the garden remained part of the grounds.

=== Second World War ===
In the early stages of the Second World War, the Berystede accommodated the titled and wealthy who were fleeing the German army's advance across central and eastern Europe. King Zog and Queen Geraldine of Albania stayed for a short time. Later, the hotel was requisitioned for war service. When the Courts of Justice became a casualty of the bombing, hearings were held at the Berystede. 180 cases were dealt with during this period. For the last two and a half years of the war 30 officers of the 8th and 9th United States Air Force, the First Allied Airborne Army and the IX Troop Carrier Command were accommodated in rooms 20–35, as they were stationed at nearby Silwood Park.

=== Late 20th and early 21st centuries ===
In 1961, the Trust House Hotels Training Centre was built, where Group personnel were trained in all aspects of hotel operation. The centre was enlarged in 1965 and an extension of 28 bedrooms completed. Later, a restaurant was added over the existing ballroom and an outdoor swimming pool (now gone) was built.

In May 1970 a wing was constructed comprising two main conference rooms, four small meeting rooms, a lounge area, bar and 32 additional bedrooms. The hotel's main customers were business people rather than tourists. The convenience of Berystede for Sunningdale and Wentworth golf courses attracted well known professional golfers like Tony Jacklin and Bob Charles. By August 1973, the hotel had 104 bedrooms and the restaurant seated up to 200 diners. An "unusual aspect" according to the Bracknell and Ascot Times was Berystede's themed evenings. Jamaican, Olde English, French and Spanish cabaret evenings, among others, were held in the suitably decked out restaurant. An apéritif or wine-tasting was followed by a four-course meal of national dishes, served by waiting staff attired in traditional costume.

Rosalind Renshaw writing in the Reading Evening Post in April 1988 opined that the Berystede was "utterly, quintessentially English" and "perhaps the most prestigious hotel in the Thames Valley". BBC Radio 2 broadcast a series of half-hourly concerts titled "Tea at the Berystede" as part of its Sunday afternoon Vintage Years programme from 29 October 1995 until 3 December 1995. The series was presented by Leonard Pearcy and featured the Palm Court Trio led by Martin Loveday, accompanied by a different weekly guest.

As a Macdonald hotel

In 2001 the Berystede became a member of the Macdonald Hotels Group. In 2006 it underwent a £10 million redevelopment and refurbishment, which included the addition of a health and beauty spa and a further 39 bedrooms. Pat Moore writing in InBritain magazine in 2006 describes the hotel as having a "wonderfully opulent, yet friendly atmosphere" and mentions its "sparkly" chandeliers, red tapestry-covered sofas, baronial fireplace and the "wheezily" ticking of a grandfather clock.

== See also ==
- Standish family
- Standish, Greater Manchester

== Sources ==
- "Some Ramblings of an old Bogonian, Stories in and Around South Ascot" Percy Hathaway (1995)
