= John Woodcock (martyr) =

Blessed John Woodcock aka "Martin of Saint Felix" O.F.M.
- Born: c. 1603; Leyland, Lancashire, England
- Died: 7 August 1646 (aged 42 - 43); Lancaster Castle, Lancaster, Lancashire, England
- Venerated in: Roman Catholic Church
- Beatified: 22 November 1987 by Pope John Paul II
- Feast: 7 August

John Woodcock (1603–1646), sometimes called John Farington, was a Franciscan priest from Lancashire executed in August 1646 under the Jesuits, etc. Act 1584 for being a priest and present in the realm.

== Life ==
John Woodcock was born at Woodcock Hall in Leyland, Lancashire, in England. His parents, Thomas and Dorothy Anderton Woodcock, were of the middle class. His father conformed to protect the family estate, while his mother remained Catholic. His maternal uncle, William Anderton, was a priest.

Woodcock converted to Catholicism about 1623, which displeased his father to the extent that John went to live with his maternal grandfather at Clayton. Eventually, he and others crossed over to Belgium. He studied at Saint-Omer, and after completing the humanities was sent to the English College, Rome, for further theological studies.

An attempt to join the Order of Friars Minor Capuchin in Paris, he was interrupted by poor health and wandered around Europe for some time before approaching the English Franciscans at Douai. He received the habit from Henry Heath in 1631, and was given the name Martin of St. Felix, and was professed by Arthur Bell a year later. For some years he lived at Arras as chaplain to a Sheldon. He served in England briefly in 1635 but was sent back to France because of ill health. He was sent to Spa, Belgium to recuperate.

Upon learning of the execution in April 1643 of Henry Heath, who had received him into the order, Woodcock applied for permission to return to England. In summer 1644 he landed at Newcastle-on-Tyne and went to Woodcock Hall. He was almost arrested while preparing to say Mass at nearby Woodend, but managed to hide in a priest hole and later escape and return to Woodcock Hall. His father sent him away, and in trying to reach Preston, was captured at either Bamber Bridge or Walton-le-Dale.

Woodcock was taken to Lancaster Castle prison, where his uncle managed to visit him on occasion. After two years' imprisonment in Lancaster Castle, he was condemned on 6 August 1646, on his own confession, for being a priest, together with two others, Edward Bamber and Thomas Whittaker.

On 7 August 1646, in an attempted execution, he was flung off a ladder, but the rope broke. He was then hanged a second time, was cut down and disembowelled alive. The Franciscan Sisters at Taunton possess an arm-bone of the martyr.

Woodcock sometimes went by the alias "Farington".

John Woodcock was among the eighty-five martyrs of England and Wales beatified by Pope John Paul II on 22 November 1987.
