= Edward Morgan (priest, died 1642) =

Welsh Catholic Priest and Martyr

Venerable Edward Morgan
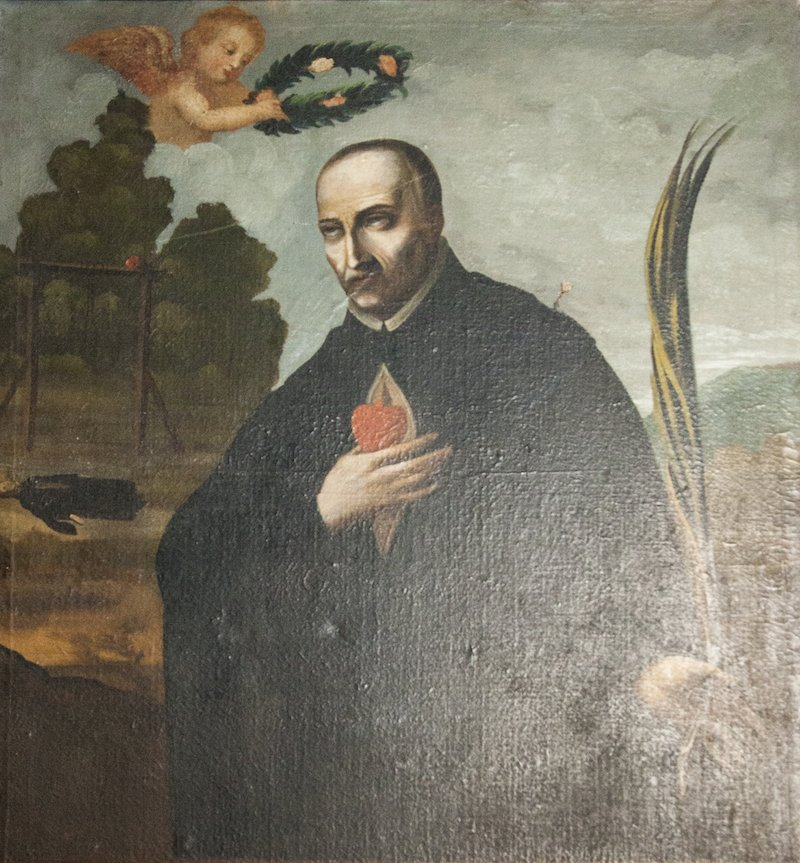
- Portrait of Venerable Edward Morgan in the Royal English College in Valladolid
- Born: Bettisfield
- Died: 26 April 1642; Tyburn, London, England

Edward Morgan (died 26 April 1642) was a Welsh Catholic priest and martyr. He was declared venerable by Pope Leo XIII in 1886.

== Life ==
Morgan was born at Bettisfield, Hanmer, Flintshire. His father's name was William. His mother is only known to have been related to the Lieutenant of the Tower of London. From the fact that Morgan was known at St. Omer as John Singleton, Gillow thinks that she was one of the Singletons of Steyning Hall, near Blackpool, in Lancashire.

Of his reported education at Douai College, no evidence appears; but he certainly was a scholar at St. Omer, and at the English College, Rome, Valladolid, and Madrid. For a brief period in 1609 he was a Jesuit novice, having been one of the numerous converts of Father John Bennett, SJ. From Salamanca, he was sent on the English mission in 1621.

=== Martyrdom ===
He seems to have gone to Wales, and in April 1629, was in prison in Flintshire, for refusing the oath of allegiance. Later about 1632 he was condemned in the Star Chamber to have his ears nailed to the pillory for having accused certain judges of treason. Immediately afterwards he was committed to the Fleet Prison in London, where he remained until a few days before his death on 26 April.

He was condemned at the Old Bailey for being a priest under the provisions of the Jesuits, etc. Act 1584 on St. George's Day, 23 April 1642. At the same time was condemned John Francis Quashet, a Scots Minim, who subsequently died in Newgate Prison. Morgan was executed at Tyburn, London. A letter purporting to be Morgan's last, written at Newgate prison on 23 April and addressed to the King and Parliament, was published in London on the 29th.

== Legacy ==
Venerable Edward Morgan Catholic Primary School in Shotton, Flintshire, Wales is named after him.
