= Edward Bamber =

English Roman Catholic priest and martyr (died 1646)

Blessed Edward Bamber
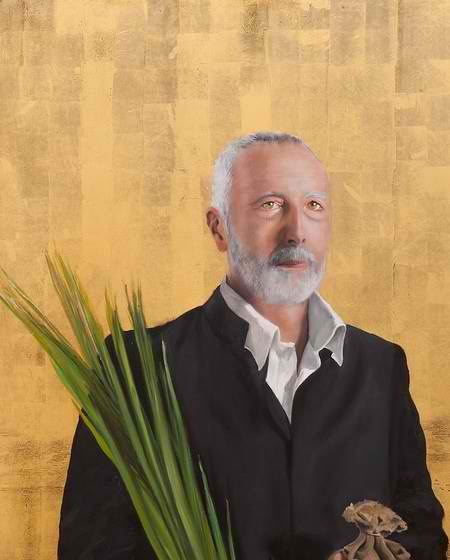

Priest and Martyr
- Born: c. 1600 at the Moor, Poulton-le-Fylde
- Died: 7 August 1646 (aged 45 - 46); Lancaster Castle, Lancaster
- Beatified: 22 November 1987 by Pope John Paul II
- Feast: 7 August, 22 November
- Attributes: Martyr's palm, small bag of money

Edward Bamber (alias Reading) (b. c. 1600, at the Moor, Poulton-le-Fylde, Lancashire; executed at Lancaster 7 August 1646) was an English Roman Catholic priest. He was beatified in 1987.

== Life ==
Bamber was born the son of Richard Bamber, at Carleton, Poulton-le-Fylde, Lancashire. He entered the College of St. Omer and later attended the English College of St Gregory in Seville. He was ordained in 1626 and sent to England. On landing at Dover, he knelt down to thank God. Seen doing this by the Governor of Dover Castle, he was arrested and banished.

He returned again, and was soon afterwards apprehended near Standish, Lancashire; he had probably been chaplain at Standish Hall. On his way to Lancaster Castle he was lodged at the Old-Green-Man Inn near Claughton-on-Brock, and managed to escape through a window, his keepers being drunk. He was found wandering in the fields by a Mr. Singleton of Broughton Tower and was sheltered by him. Bamber spent the next sixteen years on the English Mission, serving primarily in Lancashire under various aliases.

Arrested the third time, he was committed to Lancaster Castle, where he remained in close confinement for three years, once escaping, but recaptured. At his trial with two other priests, Thomas Whitaker and John Woodcock, two apostates witnessed against him that he had administered the sacraments, and he was condemned to die. The execution took place at Lancaster Castle. At his execution he threw a handful of money into the crowd, saying, "God loveth a cheerful giver."

Edward Bamber was beatified by Pope John Paul II in November 1987.

A stained glass window in the church of St.Marie's in Standish depicts Bamber being pushed off a ladder, which served as a gallows for his execution, by two soldiers.

An ode composed on his death is still extant.

== See also ==
- Catholic Church in the United Kingdom
- Douai Martyrs
- Eighty-five martyrs of England and Wales
