= Ashenda =

Cultural festival celebrated by Amhara and Tigray women

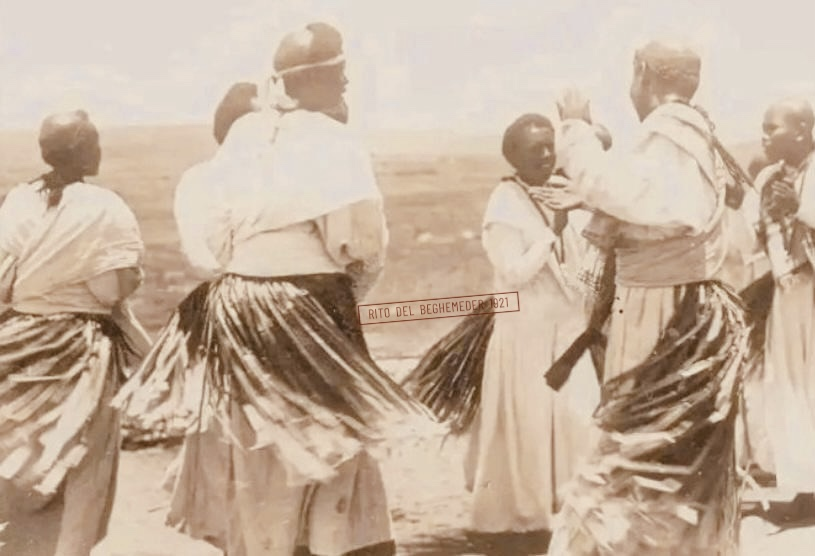
- Ashenda celebration at Gonder Beghmeder 1921
- Official name: Ashenda
- Also called: Girls' Freedom Celebration Day
- Observed by: Amharas, Tigrayans and Agews
- Type: Cultural
- Begins: 16 August
- Ends: 26 August
- Date: August 16-26
- Frequency: Annual

Ashenda is an annual festival in Ethiopia and Eritrea celebrating women and girls. The festival takes place in the month of August.

Tigrayan women living throughout the world try to make it to Mekelle or in their respective village where the Ashenda festival takes place.

In Amhara, Ashenda/Ashendeye is celebrated by virgin girls in the church and in a neighbourhood not far away from home singing Ashenda songs.

In Tigray, Ashenda has evolved into a large public celebration often held in stadiums and major city squares, where concerts, live music, and organized cultural performances draw thousands of participants. Regional institutions and local authorities frequently sponsor these events, providing stages, sound systems, and security, which has helped shape Ashenda into a modern, state-sponsored cultural festival. Its contemporary expression in Tigray is primarily civic and cultural, centered on public gatherings, music, and community celebration. Only women participate in the celebration. The festival lasts for days.

== Festival ==
On the first day of the festival, participants gather and go from house to house in their communities, singing, dancing, and entertaining families in exchange for small gifts or tokens of appreciation. After visiting homes, they gather in open fields, stadiums or public spaces to continue their celebrations, which include more dancing, singing, and socializing.

== Name ==
The name Ashenda (አሸንዳ) originates from the Latin word Ascend/Ascendía. Locally Ashenda is a type of tall green grass. During the festival, girls use this grass as part of their attire, often weaving it into skirts or carrying it as decorative bundles on their backs. The grass symbolizes vitality, growth, and a connection to nature, reflecting the themes of joy and renewal central to the celebration. The festival is celebrated under different names like Ayeni Wari (Axum: ዓይኒ ዋሪ ) that translates to "the eye of an exquisite small bird".

== See also ==
- Adabina
