= English College of St Gregory =

English Catholic College in Seville, Spain

- El Colegio de los Ingleses
- Other name: English College Seville
- Type: Seminary
- Active: 1592–1767
- Founder: Robert Persons SJ
- Religious affiliation: Roman Catholic (Jesuit)

The English College of St Gregory was an English Catholic seminary in Seville, Spain. It was founded by the English Jesuit Robert Persons in 1592. Roman Catholicism had become illegal in England, and following the example of the English College, Douai Persons aimed to provide his native country with priests in defiance of the law, establishing seminaries at Valladolid and Seville. All three colleges received protection from Philip II of Spain.

The dedication of the college at Seville to St Gregory recalls the Gregorian mission of AD 596, which resulted in the Anglo-Saxons being converted to Christianity. In 1596, in Seville, Persons wrote Memorial for the Reformation of England, concerning how England might be returned to the Roman Catholic faith.

== Leadership ==
There were changes of leadership and of policies in the early 17th century. There were questions about how the church in England should be organised, and for example Richard Smith, who taught at Seville, developed different ideas from Persons about the project. Persons left for Rome where he was to die in 1610. Despite the risks, Smith returned to England in 1603. Joseph Creswell, who looked after the interests of the English Colleges at the Spanish court, went to Rome in the aftermath of the Gunpowder Plot.

== Closure ==
The institution continued, although short of funds. It was supported by the Jesuits until 1767 when Charles III, in a surprise move, expelled the order from Spain. Its assets were then transferred to the English College in Valladolid, which had also been founded by Persons. This continued to function under the protection of the Spanish crown.

== Alumni ==
- Archbishop Patrick Fitzsimons STD, Irish Bishop, served as Archbishop of Dublin
- Bishop Michael Fitzwalter, Irish Bishop who served as Auxiliary Bishop of Seville.

== Other English Catholic Colleges ==
- English College, Douai, a past Catholic seminary in Douai, France, closed in 1793
- English College, Lisbon, a past Roman Catholic seminary in Lisbon, Portugal, closed in 1973
- English College, Valladolid, a residence and training centre for the training of Catholic priests in Valladolid, Spain
- English College, Rome, a Roman Catholic seminary in Rome, Italy

== See also ==
- Catholic Church in Spain
- List of Jesuit sites
