= Thomas Whittaker (martyr) =

Blessed Thomas Whittaker
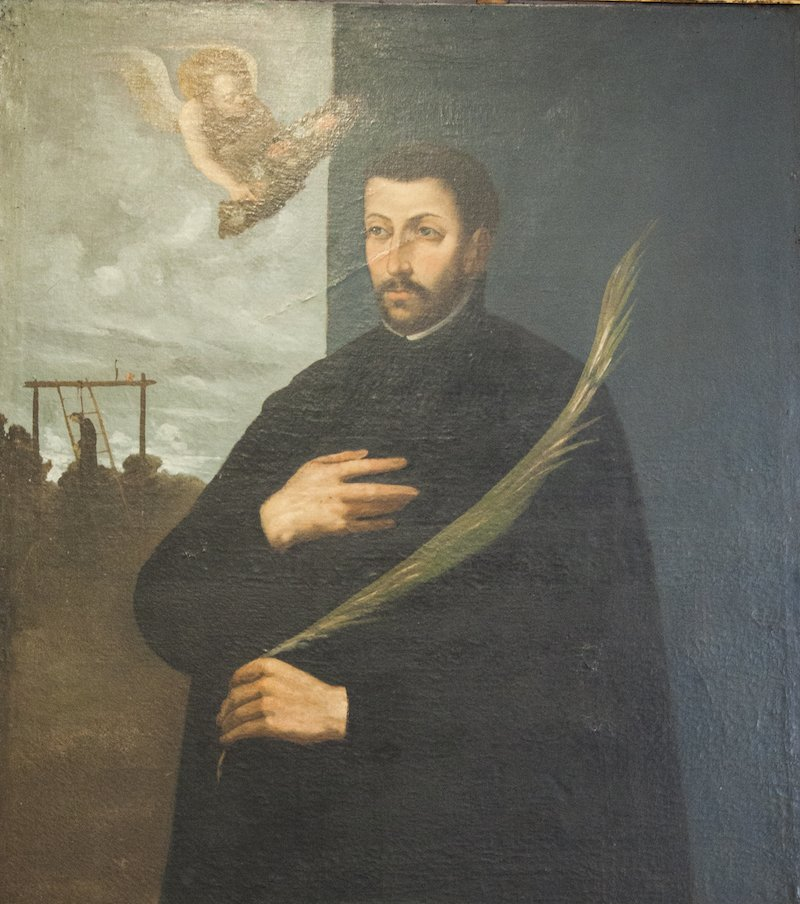
- Portrait in the Royal English College in Valladolid

Priest and Martyr
- Born: c. 1614; Burnley, Lancashire, England
- Died: 7 August 1646 (aged 31 - 32); Lancaster, England
- Venerated in: Roman Catholic Church
- Beatified: 22 November 1987 by Pope John Paul II
- Feast: 7 August, 22 November, 29 October
- Attributes: martyr's palm

Thomas Whittaker (1614 at Burnley, Lancashire – executed 7 August 1646 at Lancaster) was an English Roman Catholic priest. A Catholic martyr, he was beatified in 1987.

== Life ==
Son of Thomas Whitaker, schoolmaster, and Helen, his wife, he was educated first at his father's school. By the generosity of the Towneley family he was then sent to Valladolid, where he studied for the priesthood.

After ordination (1638) he returned to England, and for five years worked in Lancashire, including places such as Claughton-on-Brock. On one occasion he was arrested, but escaped while being conducted to Lancaster Castle, by climbing out the upstairs window of an inn.

He was seized at Place Hall in Goosnargh, and much abused and beaten by the priest catchers. Whittaker was committed to Lancaster Castle, 7 August 1643, undergoing solitary confinement for six weeks. For three years he remained in prison. Before his trial he made a month's retreat in preparation for death.

Though naturally timorous, and suffering much from the anticipation of his execution, he declined all attempts made to induce him to conform to the state church by the offer of his life. He was executed with Edward Bamber and John Woodcock, saying to the sheriff: "Use your pleasure with me, a reprieve or even a pardon upon your conditions I utterly refuse".
