= English College, Rome =

Seminary for English and Welsh Catholic priests in Rome, Italy

Venerable English College
- Coat of arms
- Click on the map for a fullscreen view
- 41°53′44.328″N 12°28′11.625″E
- Location: Via di Monserrato, 45; Roma, Italia 00186
- Country: Italy
- Denomination: Roman Catholic
- Website: www.vecrome.org

History
- Founder: Cardinal William Allen

Administration
- Archdiocese: Rome

Clergy
- Rector: The Rev. Richard Marsden

The Venerable English College (Italian: Venerabile Collegio Inglese), commonly referred to as the English College, is a Catholic seminary in Rome, Italy, for the training of priests for England and Wales. It was founded in 1579 by William Allen on the model of the English College, Douai.

The current Rector is the Rev. Richard Marsden of the Diocese of Middlesbrough, who succeeded Stephen Wang in 2026 when Wang was appointed Bishop of Arundel and Brighton.

== History ==
=== St Thomas' Hospice (1362–1579) ===
The English Hospice of the Most Holy Trinity and St Thomas was founded in the Regola quarter of Rome in 1362 when the English community in Rome purchased a house from the rosary sellers John and Alice Shephard. The Jubilee Year of 1350, which had seen the influx of over a million pilgrims anxious to gain the Plenary Indulgence offered by Pope Clement VI, had exposed the notorious shortcomings of accommodation in the Eternal City. English pilgrims had paid extortionate prices to stay in damp and filthy hostels far from St Peter's Basilica and the Holy Door through which they had come to pass. Innkeepers gave rooms designed to accommodate four people to groups of eight or more and often treated the pilgrims with violence and extortion. Many had drowned in the Tiber after the collapse of a temporary bridge and others died from the disease endemic to their rat-infested lodgings. The foundation of the Hospice was in direct response to this situation, with the stated aim of caring for "poor, infirm, needy and wretched persons from England".

The Hospice of St Thomas grew into the major centre for English visitors and residents in Rome. In 1376 a Chapel was erected on the site of the present College Church, and remnants of the impressive structure still remain in the College Garden. The new Chapel attracted royal patronage and by the reign of Henry VII the institution had become known as "The King's Hospice", with a Warden appointed by the Crown. Evidence of this early royal connection may be seen in the present-day building, which contains a corbel of fumed oak and a stone shield, both bearing the arms of the Plantagenet kings.

Wardens included Thomas Linacre, founder of the Royal College of Physicians, and Cardinal Christopher Bainbridge, Archbishop of York and Papal Legate, who was poisoned by one of his chaplains at the Hospice on 7 July 1514 and whose magnificent marble tomb remains in the College Church. Robert Neweton, described in 1399 as chaplain procurator of the Hospice of the Holy Trinity & St Thomas the Martyr, may have been a warden as might William Holdernes (fl. 1396)

During the 237 years of its existence, the English Hospice received many thousands of pilgrims, one of the most famous being the mystic, Margery Kempe, who visited in 1416. In 1481, 218 pilgrims stayed here, and during the plague of 1482, the Hospice cared for 96 sick pilgrims. However, two events in the early sixteenth century led to a radical decline in the fortunes of the Hospice.

During the Sack of Rome in 1527 troops of the Holy Roman Emperor broke into the Hospice and carried away the greater part of its gold and silver ware, its movable property and its extensive archive of papers and manuscripts. The decision of Henry VIII to break with Rome almost entirely impeded the flow of English pilgrims to Rome. Pope Paul III took over the Hospice in the year 1538 and placed it in the hands of Cardinal Reginald Pole, himself cousin to Henry VIII. When Pole returned to England as Archbishop of Canterbury under Mary I, it seemed that the Hospice would revive as a pilgrim institution, but the accession of Elizabeth I brought darker days. Acting as little more than a refuge for a few decrepit chaplains and exiles, the Hospice spent less than a tenth of its income on welcoming guests.

=== Foundation of the college (1579) ===
In 1576, with the encouragement of Gregory XIII, William Allen converted the moribund Hospice into a seminary, known as the Collegium Anglorum or English College. Allen had already founded a seminary, the English College at Douai (now in France) in 1568 and had drawn to it 40 students. Its first students arrived there from Douai in 1577 and Gregory XIII issued the Bull of Foundation in 1579. The Pope gave the new English College a yearly grant and property, including the Abbey of San Savino at Piacenza. The tradition of hospitality continued, and the College received several eminent guests, including the philosopher, Thomas Hobbes, (26 December 1635), the physician, William Harvey (1636), the poets John Milton (1638) and Richard Crashaw (1646), and the diarist, John Evelyn (1644).

Division and disorder overhung the first years of the English College. A Welshman, Maurice Clenock (Morus Clynnog), was made perpetual warden in 1578, an appointment unpopular with both the students and the Hospice chaplains, whom he had just expelled. He was accused of unduly favouring his Welsh fellow-countrymen at the expense of the English students, who numbered thirty-three as against seven Welsh students. Clenock, together with Owen Lewis, an influential curial official, saw the new College as a home for exiles which would wait for the restoration of the old order. Students were encouraged to learn Italian so that they could take up posts in Italy while they waited for England's conversion. However, many of the students shared the missionary ideals of the Society of Jesus, equating the jungles of heathen South America with the woods of Protestant England. What they wanted was a house of studies preparing ordinands for immediate mission. For over a year, the two factions circulated petitions and memorials, including one that called the Welsh barbarous savages who dwelt in a remote mountainous corner of Britain. Students waylaid the Pope to ask for his assistance, and the future Martyr, Ralph Sherwin, drew his sword in the refectory (the kitchen of the present-day building). In April 1579, the Pope appointed a Jesuit, Alfonso Agazzari rector, leaving Clenock still warden of the hospital. Jesuits remained in charge until 1773.

=== The English Romayne Life and Anthony Munday ===
An interesting description of life in the early days of the seminary comes from the pen of Anthony Munday. Coming to Rome in 1578 with a friend, Thomas Nowell, he stayed at the College and later published his impressions in The English Romayne Life (1582). Here he describes a typical dinner at the College;

“Every man has his own trencher, his manchet, knife, spoon and fork laid by it, and then a fair white napkin covering it, with his glass and pot of wine set by him. And the first mess, or antepast (as they call it)….is some fine meat to urge them to have an appetite….The fourth is roasted meat, of the daintiest provision that they can get, and sometimes stewed and baked meat....The first and last is sometimes cheese, sometimes preserved conceits, sometimes figs, almonds and raisins, a lemon and sugar, a pomegranate, or some such sweet gear; for they know that Englishmen loveth sweetmeats.”

On returning to England, Munday turned informer and helped to betray Edmund Campion and other Jesuit priests.

=== The age of the martyrs (1581–1679) ===
The College has been known as the "Venerable English College" since 1818 because of the 44 students who were martyred for the Roman Catholic faith between 1581 and 1679, as well as the 130 who suffered imprisonment and exile. Forty of these have since been canonised or beatified by the Church.

The College's Protomartyr was St Ralph Sherwin. He was born in Rodsley, Derbyshire, around 1550 and educated at Eton College and at Exeter College, Oxford, before leaving for Douai and then Rome, where, like every subsequent generation of seminarists, he studied at the Roman College, which later became the Pontifical Gregorian University. His name stands first in the Liber Ruber (a list of students who took the missionary oath in Rome before returning to England), where he is recorded as saying that he was ready, "today rather than tomorrow, at a sign from his superiors to go into England for the helping of souls".

His time soon came, and within four months of landing, he was captured, imprisoned, tortured and finally hanged, drawn and quartered at Tyburn on 1 December 1581. Many others followed – including St Robert Southwell, the Jesuit poet (1595), and his fellow Jesuit St Henry Morse, the "Priest of the Plague" (1645). The last College martyrdoms were in 1679 during the anti-Roman Catholic hysteria following the "Popish Plot", when David Lewis, John Wall and Anthony Turner suffered.

The College soon gained a reputation as a nursery of Martyrs. A custom arose of a student preaching before the Pope every Saint Stephen's Day on the theme of Martyrdom. Blessed John Cornelius called the College the "Pontifical Seminary of Martyrs" in his St Stephen's sermon of 1581. St Philip Neri, the "Second Apostle of Rome", who lived opposite the College at S. Girolamo della Carità, used to greet the students with the words "Salvete Flores Martyrum" (Hail! flowers of the Martyrs), and the great Oratorian historian, Cardinal Cesare Baronio, paid tribute to the English martyrs in his 1585 revision of the martyrology. In the College church Niccolò Circignani painted a series of frescoes of English saints and martyrs which began with St Joseph of Arimathea's supposed visit to Britain and ended with the College martyrs, their sufferings shown in graphic detail. Copies of these frescoes can be seen in the tribune, and afforded important evidence of contemporary veneration of the martyrs during the process of their beatification and canonisation.

“The Martyrs’ Picture” is the first thing one notices upon entering the College church. It was painted by Durante Alberti in 1580, just after the foundation of the College, and depicts the Blessed Trinity with two English martyrs: St Thomas of Canterbury on the left-hand side and St Edmund, King of East Anglia, on the right. Blood from Christ’s wounds is shown falling onto a map of the British Isles, and from this blood fire is springing up. This ties in with the College motto, held by a cherub: Ignem veni mittere in terram (I have come to bring fire to the earth). According to tradition, students gathered around this picture to sing a Te Deum whenever news reached Rome of the martyrdom of a former student. This custom continues today when the Te Deum is sung in front of the painting on 1 December, “Martyrs’ Day”, and the relics of the Martyrs, preserved beneath the Altar, are venerated by the students.

=== The college martyrs ===
- St Ralph Sherwin, 1581
- Bl Thomas Cottam, 1582
- St Luke Kirby, 1582
- Bl. John Shert, 1582
- Bl. William Lacey (Catholic priest), 1582
- Bl. William Hart, 1583
- Bl. Robert Nutter (priest), 1584
- Bl. John Munden (priest), 1584
- Bl. Thomas Hemerford, 1584
- Bl. George Haydock, 1584
- Bl. John Lowe, 1586
- Bl. Christopher Buxton, 1588
- Bl. Edward James, 1588
- Bl. Richard Leigh, 1588
- Bl. Robert Morton, 1588
- Bl. Edmund Duke, 1590
- Bl. Christopher Bales, 1590
- St Polydore Plasden, 1591
- St Eustace White, 1591
- Bl. Joseph Lambton, 1592
- Bl. Thomas Pormort, 1592
- Bl. John Cornelius S.J., 1594
- Bl. John Ingram, 1594
- Bl. Edward Thwing, 1594
- St Robert Southwell S.J., 1595
- St Henry Walpole S.J., 1595
- Bl. Robert Middleton, 1601
- Venerable Thomas Tichborne, 1602
- Bl. Robert Watkinson, 1602
- Bl. Thomas Tichborne S.J., 1602
- Bl. Edward Oldcorne, 1606
- St John Almond, 1612
- Bl. Richard Smith, 1612
- Bl. John Thules, 1616
- Bl. John Lockwood, 1642
- Ven. Edward Morgan, 1642
- Ven. Brian Tansfield S.J., 1643
- St Henry Morse S.J., 1645
- Bl. John Woodcock O.F.M., 1646
- Ven. Edward Mico S.J., 1678
- Bl. Anthony Turner S.J., 1679
- St David Lewis S.J., 1679
- St John Wall O.F.M., 1679

=== Cardinal Howard and the "king over the water" ===
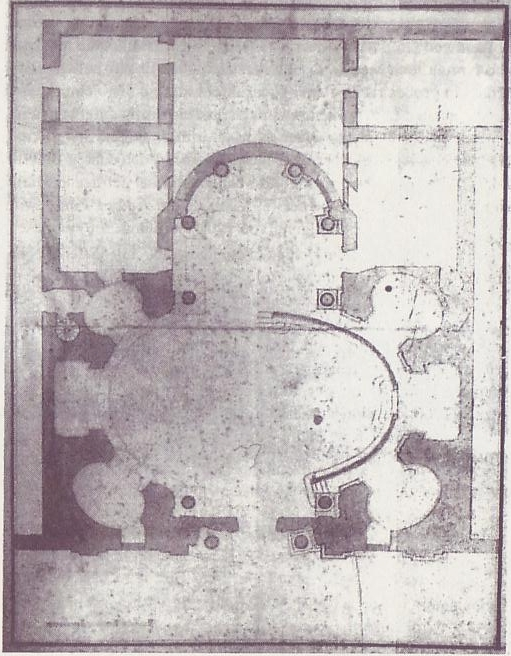
Plan for an oval church

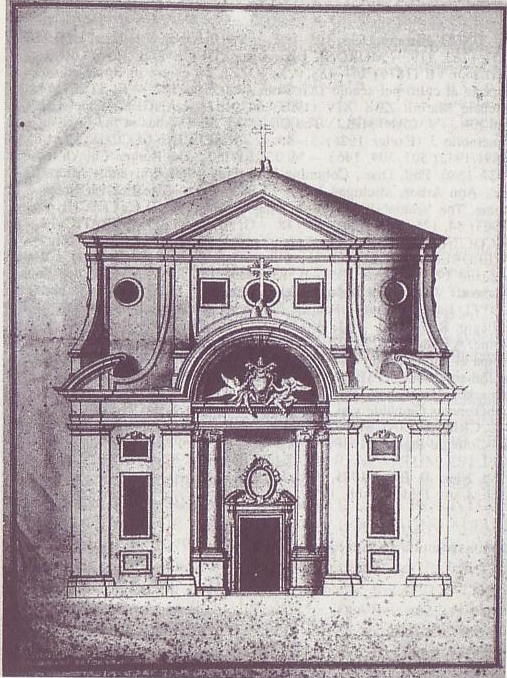
Drawing by Pozzo

The last College martyr suffered in 1679. Two years later, most of the College was rebuilt, although plans to build a new oval church with a double dome never materialised. The Jesuit Andrea Pozzo designed the fresco of the Assumption in the domestic chapel, for which, as College documents attest, he was paid 22 scudi. Between 1682 and 1694 part of the College site was rebuilt as a Palazzo by the Cardinal Protector of Great Britain, Philip Howard, third son of the Earl of Arundel. Of particular note is the fresco of St George slaying the dragon on the ceiling of the College Refectory.

During the eighteenth century, the College attached itself to Jacobitism, praying for a restored Stuart monarchy which would be sympathetic to the Catholic faith. The Stuart pretenders, who lived nearby at the Palazzo Muti, were occasional visitors to the College.

Shortly after the death of the "Old Pretender" (James Francis Edward Stuart) in 1766, Charles Edward Stuart was received by the Rector and attended Mass there. A rumour spread around Rome that the Prince had been crowned during the service and proclaimed as Charles III. The Pope, who had recently withdrawn his support for the Stuart cause, was furious and dismissed the Rector. However, Jacobite sympathies lingered on in the College until the death of the last Pretender, Henry, Cardinal Duke of York, in 1807.

In 1773, Clement XIV was persuaded to suppress the Society of Jesus, which until then had run the affairs of the College. The General of the Jesuits, Lorenzo Ricci, was imprisoned in the College for a month before being removed to Castel Sant'Angelo. The College passed under the supervision of Italian secular priests.

In 1796, Napoleon invaded Italy and in 1798, General Berthier entered Rome. The Pope, Pius VI, fled to Sienna and the students of the College left were sent back to England. The College buildings were sacked, turned into a barracks and finally a police station. The church roof was used as a supply of timber and the lead coffins were taken up from the crypt and melted down to make bullets. Mass obligations were farmed out to neighbouring churches.

=== Wiseman and the golden age ===
The College, without staff or students, survived the Napoleonic period; account books and legal meetings continued throughout the period, largely due to the support of the Cardinal Protector, Romoaldo Braschi-Onesti, nephew of Pius VI. In 1818 an English rector, Robert Gradwell, was appointed and started the life of the College anew with a small group of students, including Nicholas Wiseman, who subsequently became rector at the age of 27 (1828) and the first Cardinal Archbishop of Westminster (1850).

Wiseman succeeded in making the College a centre of intellectual and social life. He became a professor of Syriac at the University of Rome and received many distinguished visitors to the College, such as John Henry Newman, Thomas Babington Macaulay, William Ewart Gladstone, Henry Edward Manning, Hugues Felicité Robert de Lamennais and Jean-Baptiste Henri Lacordaire. One of his students was Ignatius Spencer who later joined the Passionists.

In 1866 Pope Pius IX laid the foundation stone of a new College Church, designed by Count Virginio Vespignani, the old Hospice church having been unusable for decades. This building was completed in 1888. During the Capture of Rome in 1870, the College was slightly damaged by cannon fire, as it had been in 1849, and students sheltered in the cellar.

=== The World Wars ===
The inter-war period saw the rectorships of Arthur Hinsley (1917–1929) and William Godfrey (1929–1939), who both later became Cardinal Archbishops of Westminster. They encouraged a highly Anglicised type of Romanitas in which a consciousness of Imperial superiority was tempered by a deep affection for Italy and all things Italian. Students put on concerts, plays and Gilbert and Sullivan operas, organised debates and societies, and ran a successful in-house journal, The Venerabile, as well as the periodical Chi Lo Sa? (Who Knows?), in which the Superiors of the College were mercilessly satirised. Edward VII visited the College in 1903, and George V sent a signed photograph to the students during his visit to Rome exactly twenty years later. The products of this healthy regime, including Cardinals Griffin and Heenan, were to lead English Roman Catholics into the 1970s.

Hinsley did a great deal of restructuring work, including the buying of a new villa at Palazzola. This former Franciscan Friary replaced the cramped summer house at Monte Porzio which students had used since the seventeenth century. In 1926, with the help of front page support from The Times, Hinsley saved the College from a scheme of the Rome city planners to destroy some of the buildings to make room for a covered market.

World War II resulted in a second period of exile for the College. Dressed in civilian clothes, courtesy of the stageman, the house left Rome on 16 May 1940 and narrowly secured places on the last boat for England from Le Havre, which was about to fall. The College buildings were used as a hospital organised by the Knights of Malta from 1941 to 1944. Students continued classes and seminary life first at Ambleside in the Lake District and then at the Jesuit Stonyhurst College, returning to Rome in the autumn of 1946.

=== The Second Vatican Council ===
The English and Welsh bishops stayed at the College during the Second Vatican Council (1962–1965), as they had done during the First Vatican Council (1869–70).

=== Recent history ===
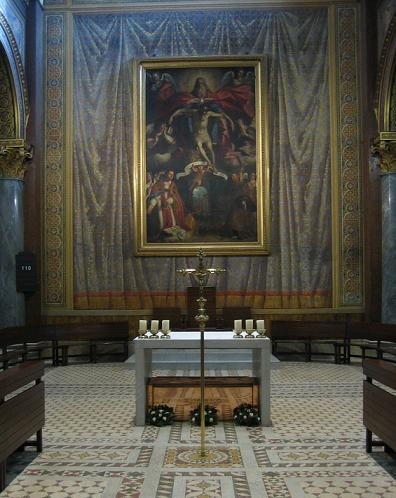
Interior of the Church of the Venerable English College

In 1979, on the College's fourth centenary, John Paul II celebrated Mass in the Church and joined the students for a festive banquet in the refectory. The College Church, having been rebuilt in 1888, was finally dedicated on 1 December 1981, the fourth centenary of the martyrdom of St Ralph Sherwin.

On 1 December 2012 (Martyrs' Day – its annual commemoration of former students who had suffered martyrdom), the College celebrated the 650th anniversary of the foundation of the original hospice on the site with a concelebrated Mass at which the Duke and Duchess of Gloucester were present as representatives of the Queen, together with the Archbishop of Westminster, Vincent Nichols, and the Cardinal Archbishop Emeritus of Westminster, Cormac Murphy-O'Connor, a former Rector of the College. This celebration was followed by a papal audience with Pope Benedict XVI on 3 December 2012.

In April 2017 Charles, Prince of Wales visited the college, along with Archbishop Nichols, during the Prince's European tour.

== The college arms ==
The College's coat of arms follows ecclesiastical usage. It features the symbol of the Pope's apostolic authority, namely, the Triple Tiara used in conjunction with the silver key (symbolising the power of St Peter's successor to bind and loose on earth) and the golden key (symbolising the power of St Peter's successor to bind and loose in heaven). Cardinal Allen and Pope Gregory XVI, who co-founded the College, are represented by the dragon rampant and the three hares. The two Lions Rampant come from the arms of Edward III, representing in some sense the patronage bestowed on the College by every English king between the fourteenth century and the Protestant Reformation. During this period the Warden of the College was often England's Ambassador to the Holy See. The shell at the bottom of the arms is the traditional emblem of the pilgrim and recalls the origins of the present institution as a hospice for English visitors to Rome. The motto "Ignem Veni Mittere In Terram" ( "I have come to bring fire to the earth", Luke 12:49) is taken from the Martyrs' Picture, which hangs behind the altar in the College church and reflects the zeal with which the first Martyrs returned to possible death in Protestant England and Wales.

== The college garden ==
Although located in central Rome, the College possesses an extensive garden (laid out substantially as it was in the days of the Martyrs) and a swimming pool, recently refurbished with the aid of the Friends of the Venerabile. As swimming pools were for many years prohibited for reasons of water conservation, it was once classified as a water storage facility, and a remnant of this former association survives in the College slang term for the pool, the tank. The garden contains a number of Roman columns and other pieces of classical stonework, as well as pillars and window frames from the 14th-century Chapel.

== College alumni ==
=== Twentieth century ===
- Cardinal Francis Aidan Gasquet
- Cardinal Francis Bourne
- Cardinal Arthur Hinsley
- Cardinal William Godfrey
- Cardinal William Theodore Heard
- Cardinal Cormac Murphy-O'Connor
- Norman St John-Stevas
- Sir Anthony Kenny
- Archbishop Paul Gallagher
- Cardinal Michael Fitzgerald
- Archbishop Patrick Altham Kelly
- Cardinal Vincent Nichols

== Burials ==
- Christopher Bainbridge, in the chapel of St Thomas of Canterbury at what was then called the English hospice in Rome.
- Francis Fenwick (1645–1694), an English Benedictine monk.
- George Gilbert, benefactor of the Jesuits.

== See also ==
- Beda College
- English College, Douai
- English College, Lisbon
- English College, Valladolid
- The Scots College (Rome)
- San Silvestro in Capite
- List of Jesuit sites
