= April 7 =

Date in Gregorian calendar

April 7 this year in various calendars
- Tuesday, 7 April 2026
Akan	Nkyibene
Armenian	21 Ahekani 1475
Aztec	Tlaxochimaco 7, 10 Cuāuhtli
Babylonian	18 Adaru, 2336 SE
Balinese pawukon	Luang, Pepet, Kajeng, Jaya, Wage, Urukung, Anggara of Sinta, Guru, Dangu, Raja
Bengali	24 Chaitro, BS 1432
Chinese	Yin Metal Pig・Tail Mansion; Fire Horse Year, Month 2, Day 20 (Qingming, 13 days until Guyu)
Common Era	7 April 2026 CE
Coptic	29 Paremhat, AM 1742
Egyptian	26 Mesori, 2774 NE
Ethiopian	29 Magābit, 2018 Amätä Məhrät
French Republican	Décade II, Octidi de Germinal de l'Année 234 de la République
Gregorian	7 April, AD 2026
Hebrew	20 Nisan, AM 5786; Omer 5
Hindu	Jyeṣṭhā・Vyatīpāta; Solar: 25 Caitra, 1947 SE; Lunisolar: Pañcamī, Kṛishna pakṣa of Caitra, 2083 VE; Rāudra・5126 KY・1,872,672
Icelandic	Þriðjudagur, 15 Einmánuður 2025
Islamic	19 Shawwal, AH 1447 (using tabular method)
ISO week date	2026-W15-2
Japanese	20 Kisaragi, Reiwa 8 (Seimei, 13 days until Kokuu)
Julian	25 March, AD 2026 (AM 7534)
Julian day	2461138
Korean	20 Tokkidal, 4359 DE
Maya	13.0.13.8.15; 8 Pop, 10 Men
Roman	ante diem VIII Kalendas Apriles, MMDCCLXXIX AUC
Solar Hijri	18 Farvardin, SH 1405
Tibetan	20 dbo, me pho rta 2153 or 1772 or 1000

<<	April					>>
Su	Mo	Tu	We	Th	Fr	Sa
			1	2	3	4
5	6	7	8	9	10	11
12	13	14	15	16	17	18
19	20	21	22	23	24	25
26	27	28	29	30
2026

April 7 in recent years
2026 (Tuesday)
2025 (Monday)
2024 (Sunday)
2023 (Friday)
2022 (Thursday)
2021 (Wednesday)
2020 (Tuesday)
2019 (Sunday)
2018 (Saturday)
2017 (Friday)

April 7 is the 97th day of the year (98th in leap years) in the Gregorian calendar; 268 days remain until the end of the year.

== Events ==
=== Pre-1600 ===
- 451 – Attila the Hun captures Metz in France, killing most of its inhabitants and burning the town.
- 529 – First Corpus Juris Civilis, a fundamental work in jurisprudence, is issued by Eastern Roman Emperor Justinian I.
- 1141 – Empress Matilda becomes the first female ruler of England, adopting the title "Lady of the English".
- 1348 – Holy Roman Emperor Charles IV charters Prague University.
- 1449 – Felix V abdicates his claim to the papacy, ending the reign of the final Antipope.
- 1521 – Ferdinand Magellan arrives at Cebu.
- 1541 – Francis Xavier leaves Lisbon on a mission to the Portuguese East Indies.

=== 1601–1900 ===
- 1724 – Premiere performance of Bach's St John Passion, BWV 245, at St. Nicholas Church, Leipzig.
- 1767 – End of Burmese–Siamese War (1765–1767).
- 1788 – Settlers establish Marietta, Ohio, the first permanent settlement created by U.S. citizens in the recently organized Northwest Territory.
- 1790 – Russo-Turkish war (1787–1792): Greek privateer Lambros Katsonis loses three of his ships in the Battle of Andros.
- 1795 – The French First Republic adopts the kilogram and gram as its primary unit of mass.
- 1798 – The Mississippi Territory is organized from disputed territory claimed by both the United States and the Spanish Empire. It is expanded in 1804 and again in 1812.
- 1805 – Lewis and Clark Expedition: The Corps of Discovery breaks camp among the Mandan tribe and resumes its journey West along the Missouri River.
- 1805 – German composer Ludwig van Beethoven premieres his Third Symphony, at the Theater an der Wien in Vienna.
- 1824 – The Mechanics' Institution is established in Manchester, England at the Bridgewater Arms hotel, as part of a national movement for the education of working men. The institute is the precursor to three Universities in the city: the University of Manchester, UMIST and the Metropolitan University of Manchester (MMU).
- 1831 – Pedro II becomes emperor of the Empire of Brazil.
- 1862 – American Civil War: The Union's Army of the Tennessee and the Army of the Ohio defeat the Confederate Army of Mississippi near Shiloh, Tennessee.
- 1868 – Thomas D'Arcy McGee, one of the Canadian Fathers of Confederation, is assassinated by a Fenian activist.

=== 1901–present ===
- 1906 – Mount Vesuvius erupts and devastates Naples.
- 1906 – The Algeciras Conference gives France and Spain control over Morocco.
- 1922 – Teapot Dome scandal: United States Secretary of the Interior Albert B. Fall leases federal petroleum reserves to private oil companies on excessively generous terms.
- 1926 – Violet Gibson attempts to assassinate Italian Prime Minister Benito Mussolini.
- 1933 – Prohibition in the United States is repealed for beer of no more than 3.2% alcohol by weight, eight months before the ratification of the Twenty-first Amendment to the United States Constitution. (Now celebrated as National Beer Day in the United States.)
- 1933 – Nazi Germany issues the Law for the Restoration of the Professional Civil Service banning Jews and political dissidents from civil service posts.
- 1939 – Benito Mussolini declares an Italian protectorate over Albania and forces King Zog I into exile.
- 1939 – Italy invades Albania.
- 1940 – Booker T. Washington becomes the first African American to be depicted on a United States postage stamp.
- 1943 – The Holocaust in Ukraine: In Terebovlia, Germans order 1,100 Jews to undress and march through the city to the nearby village of Plebanivka, where they are shot and buried in ditches.
- 1943 – Ioannis Rallis becomes collaborationist Prime Minister of Greece during the Axis Occupation.
- 1943 – The National Football League makes helmets mandatory.
- 1944 – In the Fragheto massacre, soldiers belonging to the German 356th Infantry Division kill 30 Italian civilians and 15 partisans near Casteldelci in central-northern Italy.
- 1945 – World War II: The Imperial Japanese Navy battleship Yamato, one of the two largest ever constructed, is sunk by United States Navy aircraft during Operation Ten-Go.
- 1946 – The Soviet Union annexes East Prussia as the Kaliningrad Oblast of the Russian Soviet Federative Socialist Republic.
- 1948 – The World Health Organization is established by the United Nations.
- 1954 – United States President Dwight D. Eisenhower gives his "domino theory" speech during a news conference.
- 1956 – Francoist Spain agrees to surrender its protectorate in Morocco.
- 1964 – IBM announces the System/360.
- 1965 – Representatives of the National Congress of American Indians testify before members of the US Senate in Washington, D.C., against the termination of the Colville tribe.
- 1968 – Two-time Formula One British World Champion Jim Clark dies in an accident during a Formula Two race in Hockenheim.
- 1969 – The Internet's symbolic birth date: Publication of RFC 1.
- 1971 – Vietnam War: President Richard Nixon announces his decision to quicken the pace of Vietnamization.
- 1972 – Vietnam War: Communist forces overrun the South Vietnamese town of Loc Ninh.
- 1976 – Member of Parliament and suspected spy John Stonehouse resigns from the Labour Party after being arrested for faking his own death.
- 1977 – German Federal prosecutor Siegfried Buback and his driver are shot by two Red Army Faction members while waiting at a red light.
- 1978 – Development of the neutron bomb is canceled by President Jimmy Carter.
- 1980 – During the Iran hostage crisis, the United States severs relations with Iran.
- 1982 – Iranian Foreign Affairs Minister Sadegh Ghotbzadeh is arrested.
- 1983 – During STS-6, astronauts Story Musgrave and Don Peterson perform the first Space Shuttle spacewalk.
- 1988 – Soviet Defense Minister Dmitry Yazov orders the Soviet withdrawal from Afghanistan.
- 1989 – Soviet submarine Komsomolets sinks in the Barents Sea off the coast of Norway, killing 42 sailors.
- 1990 – A fire breaks out on the passenger ferry Scandinavian Star, killing 159 people.
- 1990 – John Poindexter is convicted for his role in the Iran–Contra affair. In 1991 the convictions are reversed on appeal.
- 1994 – Rwandan genocide: Massacres of Tutsis begin in Kigali, Rwanda, and soldiers kill the civilian Prime Minister Agathe Uwilingiyimana.
- 1994 – Auburn Calloway attempts to destroy Federal Express Flight 705 in order to allow his family to benefit from his life insurance policy.
- 1995 – First Chechen War: Russian paramilitary troops begin a massacre of civilians in Samashki, Chechnya.
- 1999 – Turkish Airlines Flight 5904 crashes near Ceyhan in southern Turkey, killing six people.
- 2001 – NASA launches the 2001 Mars Odyssey orbiter.
- 2003 – Iraq War: U.S. troops capture Baghdad; Saddam Hussein's Ba'athist regime falls two days later.
- 2003 – Haitian president Jean-Bertrand Aristide demands reparations of $21 billion from France for the Haitian independence debt.
- 2005 – First release of Git distributed version control system.
- 2009 – Former Peruvian President Alberto Fujimori is sentenced to 25 years in prison for ordering killings and kidnappings by security forces.
- 2009 – Mass protests begin across Moldova under the belief that results from the parliamentary election are fraudulent.
- 2011 – The Israel Defense Forces use their Iron Dome missile system to successfully intercept a BM-21 Grad launched from Gaza, marking the first short-range missile intercept ever.
- 2011 – A gunman opens fire at an elementary school in Rio de Janeiro, Brazil, killing twelve children and injuring 22 others before committing suicide.
- 2017 – A man deliberately drives a hijacked truck into a crowd of people in Stockholm, Sweden, killing five people and injuring fifteen others.
- 2017 – U.S. President Donald Trump orders the 2017 Shayrat missile strike against Syria in retaliation for the Khan Shaykhun chemical attack.
- 2018 – Former Brazilian president, Luiz Inácio Lula da Silva, is arrested for corruption by determination of Judge Sérgio Moro, from the "Car-Wash Operation". Lula stayed imprisoned for 580 days, before being released by the Brazilian Supreme Court.
- 2018 – Syria launches the Douma chemical attack during the Eastern Ghouta offensive of the Syrian Civil War.
- 2020 – COVID-19 pandemic: China ends its lockdown in Wuhan.
- 2020 – COVID-19 pandemic: Acting Secretary of the Navy Thomas Modly resigns for his handling of the COVID-19 pandemic on USS Theodore Roosevelt and the dismissal of Brett Crozier.
- 2021 – COVID-19 pandemic: The Centers for Disease Control and Prevention announces that the SARS-CoV-2 Alpha variant has become the dominant strain of COVID-19 in the United States.
- 2022 – Ketanji Brown Jackson is confirmed for the Supreme Court of the United States, becoming the first black female justice.

== Births ==
=== Pre-1600 ===
- 1206 – Otto II Wittelsbach, Duke of Bavaria (died 1253)
- 1330 – John, 3rd Earl of Kent, English nobleman (died 1352)
- 1470 – Edward Stafford, 2nd Earl of Wiltshire (died 1498)
- 1506 – Francis Xavier, Spanish missionary and saint, co-founded the Society of Jesus (died 1552)
- 1539 – Tobias Stimmer, Swiss painter and illustrator (died 1584)

=== 1601–1900 ===
- 1613 – Gerrit Dou, Dutch painter (died 1675)
- 1644 – François de Neufville, duc de Villeroy, French general (died 1730)
- 1648 – John Sheffield, 1st Duke of Buckingham and Normanby, English poet and politician, Lord President of the Council (died 1721)
- 1652 – Pope Clement XII (died 1740)
- 1713 – Nicola Sala, Italian composer and theorist (died 1801)
- 1718 – Hugh Blair, Scottish minister and author (died 1800)
- 1727 – Michel Adanson, French botanist, entomologist, and mycologist (died 1806)
- 1763 – Domenico Dragonetti, Italian bassist and composer (died 1846)
- 1770 – William Wordsworth, English poet (died 1850)
- 1772 – Charles Fourier, French philosopher (died 1837)
- 1780 – William Ellery Channing, American preacher and theologian (died 1842)
- 1786 – William R. King, American lawyer and politician, 13th Vice President of the United States (died 1853)
- 1803 – James Curtiss, American journalist and politician, 11th Mayor of Chicago (died 1859)
- 1803 – Flora Tristan, French author and activist (died 1844)
- 1811 – Hasan Tahsini, Albanian astronomer, mathematician, and philosopher (died 1881)
- 1817 – Francesco Selmi, Italian chemist and patriot (died 1881)
- 1848 – Randall Davidson, Scottish archbishop (died 1930)
- 1859 – Walter Camp, American football player and coach (died 1925)
- 1860 – Will Keith Kellogg, American businessman, founded the Kellogg Company (died 1951)
- 1867 – Holger Pedersen, Danish linguist and academic (died 1953)
- 1870 – Gustav Landauer, German theorist and activist (died 1919)
- 1871 – Epifanio de los Santos, Filipino jurist, historian, and scholar (died 1927)
- 1873 – John McGraw, American baseball player and manager (died 1934)
- 1874 – Frederick Carl Frieseke, German-American painter (died 1939)
- 1876 – Fay Moulton, American sprinter, football player, coach, and lawyer (died 1945)
- 1882 – Bert Ironmonger, Australian cricketer (died 1971)
- 1882 – Kurt von Schleicher, German general and politician, 23rd Chancellor of Germany (died 1934)
- 1883 – Gino Severini, Italian-French painter and author (died 1966)
- 1884 – Clement Smoot, American golfer (died 1963)
- 1886 – Ed Lafitte, American baseball player and soldier (died 1971)
- 1889 – Gabriela Mistral, Chilean poet and educator, Nobel Prize laureate (died 1957)
- 1890 – Paul Berth, Danish footballer (died 1969)
- 1890 – Victoria Ocampo, Argentine writer (died 1979)
- 1890 – Marjory Stoneman Douglas, American journalist and activist (died 1998)
- 1891 – Ole Kirk Christiansen, Danish businessman, founded the Lego Group (died 1958)
- 1892 – Julius Hirsch, German footballer (died 1945)
- 1893 – José Sobral de Almada Negreiros, Portuguese artist (died 1970)
- 1893 – Allen Dulles, American lawyer and diplomat, 5th Director of Central Intelligence (died 1969)
- 1895 – John Bernard Flannagan, American soldier and sculptor (died 1942)
- 1895 – Margarete Schön, German actress (died 1985)
- 1896 – Frits Peutz, Dutch architect, designed the Glaspaleis (died 1974)
- 1897 – Erich Löwenhardt, Polish-German lieutenant and pilot (died 1918)
- 1897 – Walter Winchell, American journalist and radio host (died 1972)
- 1899 – Robert Casadesus, French pianist and composer (died 1972)
- 1900 – Adolf Dymsza, Polish actor (died 1975)
- 1900 – Tebbs Lloyd Johnson, English race walker (died 1984)

=== 1901–present ===
- 1902 – Eduard Eelma, Estonian footballer (died 1941)
- 1903 – M. Balasundaram, Sri Lankan lawyer and politician (died 1965)
- 1903 – Edwin T. Layton, American admiral (died 1984)
- 1904 – Roland Wilson, Australian economist and statistician (died 1996)
- 1908 – Percy Faith, Canadian composer, conductor, and bandleader (died 1976)
- 1908 – Pete Zaremba, American hammer thrower (died 1994)
- 1909 – Robert Charroux, French author and critic (died 1978)
- 1910 – Melissanthi, Greek poet, teacher and journalist (died 1990)
- 1913 – Louise Currie, American actress (died 2013)
- 1913 – Charles Vanik, American soldier, judge, and politician (died 2007)
- 1914 – Ralph Flanagan, American pianist, composer, and conductor (died 1995)
- 1914 – Domnitsa Lanitou-Kavounidou, Greek sprinter (died 2011)
- 1915 – Stanley Adams, American actor and screenwriter (died 1977)
- 1915 – Billie Holiday, American singer-songwriter and actress (died 1959)
- 1915 – Henry Kuttner, American author (died 1958)
- 1916 – Anthony Caruso, American actor (died 2003)
- 1917 – R. G. Armstrong, American actor and playwright (died 2012)
- 1918 – Bobby Doerr, American baseball player and coach (died 2017)
- 1919 – Roger Lemelin, Canadian author and screenwriter (died 1992)
- 1919 – Edoardo Mangiarotti, Italian fencer (died 2012)
- 1920 – Ravi Shankar, Indian-American sitar player and composer (died 2012)
- 1921 – Feza Gürsey, Turkish mathematician and physicist (died 1992)
- 1922 – Mongo Santamaría, Cuban-American drummer (died 2003)
- 1924 – Johannes Mario Simmel, Austrian-English author and screenwriter (died 2009)
- 1925 – Chaturanan Mishra, Indian trade union leader and politician (died 2011)
- 1925 – Jan van Roessel, Dutch footballer (died 2011)
- 1927 – Babatunde Olatunji, Nigerian-American drummer, educator, and activist (died 2003)
- 1927 – Leonid Shcherbakov, Russian triple jumper (died 2004)
- 1928 – James Garner, American actor, singer, and producer (died 2014)
- 1928 – Alan J. Pakula, American director, producer, and screenwriter (died 1998)
- 1928 – James White, Northern Irish author and educator (died 1999)
- 1929 – Bob Denard, French soldier (died 2007)
- 1929 – Joe Gallo, American gangster (died 1972)
- 1930 – Jane Priestman, English interior designer (died 2021)
- 1930 – Yves Rocher, French businessman, founded the Yves Rocher Company (died 2009)
- 1930 – Andrew Sachs, German-English actor and screenwriter (died 2016)
- 1930 – Roger Vergé, French chef and restaurateur (died 2015)
- 1931 – Donald Barthelme, American short story writer and novelist (died 1989)
- 1931 – Daniel Ellsberg, American activist and author (died 2023)
- 1931 – Ted Kotcheff, Canadian film and television director (died 2025)
- 1932 – Cal Smith, American singer and guitarist (died 2013)
- 1933 – Wayne Rogers, American actor, investor, and producer (died 2015)
- 1933 – Sakıp Sabancı, Turkish businessman and philanthropist (died 2004)
- 1934 – Ian Richardson, Scottish-English actor (died 2007)
- 1935 – Bobby Bare, American singer-songwriter and guitarist
- 1935 – Hodding Carter III, American journalist and politician, Assistant Secretary of State for Public Affairs (died 2023)
- 1937 – Charlie Thomas, American singer (died 2023)
- 1938 – Jerry Brown, American lawyer and politician, 34th and 39th Governor of California
- 1938 – Spencer Dryden, American drummer (died 2005)
- 1938 – Freddie Hubbard, American trumpet player and composer (died 2008)
- 1938 – Iris Johansen, American author
- 1939 – Francis Ford Coppola, American director, producer, and screenwriter
- 1939 – David Frost, English journalist and game show host (died 2013)
- 1939 – Gary Kellgren, American record producer, co-founded Record Plant (died 1977)
- 1939 – Brett Whiteley, Australian painter (died 1992)
- 1940 – Marju Lauristin, Estonian academic and politician, 1st Estonian Minister of Social Affairs
- 1941 – James Di Pasquale, American composer
- 1941 – Peter Fluck, English puppet maker and illustrator
- 1941 – Cornelia Frances, English-Australian actress (died 2018)
- 1941 – Gorden Kaye, English actor (died 2017)
- 1942 – Jeetendra, Indian actor, TV and film producer
- 1943 – Mick Abrahams, English singer-songwriter and guitarist (died 2025)
- 1943 – Dennis Amiss, English cricketer and manager
- 1944 – Shel Bachrach, American insurance broker, investor, businessman and philanthropist (died 2024)
- 1944 – Warner Fusselle, American sportscaster (died 2012)
- 1944 – Oshik Levi, Israeli singer and actor
- 1944 – Julia Phillips, American film producer and author (died 2002)
- 1944 – Gerhard Schröder, German lawyer and politician, 7th Chancellor of Germany
- 1944 – Bill Stoneman, American baseball player and manager
- 1945 – Megas, Icelandic singer-songwriter
- 1945 – Gerry Cottle, English circus owner (died 2021)
- 1945 – Marilyn Friedman, American philosopher and academic
- 1945 – Martyn Lewis, Welsh journalist and author
- 1945 – Joël Robuchon, French chef and author (died 2018)
- 1945 – Werner Schroeter, German director and screenwriter (died 2010)
- 1945 – Hans van Hemert, Dutch songwriter and producer (died 2024)
- 1946 – Zaid Abdul-Aziz, American basketball player
- 1946 – Colette Besson, French runner and educator (died 2005)
- 1946 – Herménégilde Chiasson, Canadian poet, playwright, and politician, 29th Lieutenant Governor of New Brunswick
- 1946 – Robert Metcalfe, American engineer and entrepreneur
- 1946 – Dimitrij Rupel, Slovenian politician and diplomat
- 1946 – Stan Winston, American special effects designer and makeup artist (died 2008)
- 1947 – Patricia Bennett, American singer
- 1947 – Florian Schneider, German singer and drummer (died 2020)
- 1947 – Michèle Torr, French singer and author
- 1948 – John Oates, American singer-songwriter guitarist, and producer
- 1948 – Arnie Robinson, American athlete (died 2020)
- 1948 – Ecaterina Andronescu, Romanian politician
- 1949 – Mitch Daniels, American academic and politician, 49th Governor of Indiana
- 1950 – Brian J. Doyle, American press secretary
- 1950 – Neil Folberg, American-Israeli photographer
- 1951 – Bruce Gary, American drummer (died 2006)
- 1951 – Janis Ian, American singer-songwriter and guitarist
- 1952 – David Baulcombe, English geneticist and academic
- 1952 – Jane Frederick, American hurdler and heptathlete
- 1952 – Gilles Valiquette, Canadian actor, singer, and producer
- 1952 – Dennis Hayden, American actor
- 1953 – Santa Barraza, American mixed media artist
- 1953 – Douglas Kell, English biochemist and academic
- 1954 – Jackie Chan, Hong Kong martial artist, actor, stuntman, director, producer, and screenwriter
- 1954 – Tony Dorsett, American football player
- 1955 – Tim Cochran, American mathematician and academic (died 2014)
- 1955 – Gregg Jarrett, American lawyer and journalist
- 1956 – Annika Billström, Swedish businesswoman and politician, 16th Mayor of Stockholm
- 1956 – Christopher Darden, American lawyer and author
- 1956 – Georg Werthner, Austrian decathlete
- 1957 – Kim Kap-soo, South Korean actor
- 1957 – Thelma Walker, British politician
- 1958 – Brian Haner, American singer-songwriter and guitarist
- 1958 – Hindrek Kesler, Estonian architect
- 1960 – Buster Douglas, American boxer and actor
- 1960 – Sandy Powell, English costume designer
- 1961 – Thurl Bailey, American basketball player and actor
- 1961 – Pascal Olmeta, French footballer
- 1961 – Brigitte van der Burg, Tanzanian-Dutch geographer and politician
- 1962 – Jon Cruddas, English lawyer and politician
- 1962 – Andrew Hampsten, American cyclist
- 1963 – Jaime de Marichalar, Spanish businessman
- 1963 – Nick Herbert, English businessman and politician, Minister for Policing
- 1963 – Dave Johnson, American decathlete and educator
- 1964 – Jace Alexander, American actor and director
- 1964 – Russell Crowe, New Zealand-Australian actor
- 1964 – Steve Graves, Canadian ice hockey player
- 1965 – Bill Bellamy, American comedian, actor, and producer
- 1965 – Rozalie Hirs, Dutch composer and poet
- 1965 – Alison Lapper, English painter and photographer
- 1965 – Nenad Vučinić, Serbian-New Zealand basketball player and coach
- 1966 – Richard Gomez, Filipino actor and politician
- 1966 – Zvika Hadar, Israeli entertainer
- 1966 – Béla Mavrák, Hungarian tenor singer
- 1966 – Gary Wilkinson, English snooker player
- 1967 – Artemis Gounaki, Greek-German singer-songwriter
- 1967 – Bodo Illgner, German footballer
- 1967 – Simone Schilder, Dutch tennis player
- 1968 – Duncan Armstrong, Australian swimmer and sportscaster
- 1968 – Jennifer Lynch, American director, producer, and screenwriter
- 1968 – Jože Možina, Slovenian historian, sociologist and journalist
- 1968 – Vasiliy Sokov, Russian triple jumper
- 1969 – Ricky Watters, American football player
- 1970 – Leif Ove Andsnes, Norwegian pianist and educator
- 1970 – Alexander Karpovtsev, Russian ice hockey player and coach (died 2011)
- 1971 – Guillaume Depardieu, French actor (died 2008)
- 1971 – Victor Kraatz, German-Canadian figure skater
- 1972 – Tim Peake, British astronaut
- 1973 – Marco Delvecchio, Italian footballer
- 1973 – Jeanine Hennis-Plasschaert, Dutch lawyer and politician, Dutch Minister of Defence
- 1973 – Carole Montillet, French skier
- 1973 – Christian O'Connell, British radio DJ and presenter
- 1973 – Brett Tomko, American baseball player
- 1975 – Karin Dreijer Andersson, Swedish singer-songwriter and producer
- 1975 – Ronde Barber, American football player and sportscaster
- 1975 – Tiki Barber, American football player and journalist
- 1975 – Ronnie Belliard, American baseball player
- 1975 – John Cooper, American singer-songwriter and bass player
- 1975 – Simon Woolford, Australian rugby league player
- 1976 – Kevin Alejandro, American actor and producer
- 1976 – Martin Buß, German high jumper
- 1976 – Jessica Lee, English lawyer and politician
- 1976 – Aaron Lohr, American actor
- 1976 – Barbara Jane Reams, American actress
- 1976 – Gang Qiang, Chinese anchor
- 1977 – Tama Canning, Australian-New Zealand cricketer
- 1977 – Karin Haydu, Slovak actress
- 1978 – Jo Appleby, English soprano
- 1978 – Duncan James, English singer-songwriter and actor
- 1978 – Lilia Osterloh, American tennis player
- 1979 – Adrián Beltré, Dominican-American baseball player
- 1979 – Patrick Crayton, American football player
- 1979 – Pascal Dupuis, Canadian ice hockey player
- 1979 – Danny Sandoval, Venezuelan-American baseball player
- 1980 – Dragan Bogavac, Montenegrin footballer
- 1980 – Bruno Covas, Brazilian lawyer, politician (died 2021)
- 1980 – Tetsuji Tamayama, Japanese actor
- 1981 – Hitoe Arakaki, Japanese singer
- 1981 – Kazuki Watanabe, Japanese songwriter and guitarist (died 2000)
- 1981 – Vanessa Olivarez, American singer-songwriter, and actress
- 1981 – Suzann Pettersen, Norwegian golfer
- 1982 – Silvana Arias, Peruvian actress
- 1982 – Sonjay Dutt, American wrestler
- 1982 – Kelli Young, English singer
- 1983 – Hamish Davidson, Australian musician
- 1983 – Franck Ribéry, French footballer
- 1983 – Jon Stead, English footballer
- 1983 – Jakub Smrž, Czech motorcycle rider
- 1983 – Janar Talts, Estonian basketball player
- 1984 – Hiroko Shimabukuro, Japanese singer
- 1985 – KC Concepcion, Filipino actress and singer
- 1985 – Humza Yousaf, Scottish politician
- 1986 – Brooke Brodack, American comedian
- 1986 – Jack Duarte, Mexican actor, singer, and guitarist
- 1986 – Andi Fraggs, English singer-songwriter and producer
- 1986 – Christian Fuchs, Austrian footballer
- 1986 – Choi Si-won, South Korean singer and actor
- 1987 – Martín Cáceres, Uruguayan footballer
- 1987 – Eelco Sintnicolaas, Dutch decathlete
- 1987 – Jamar Smith, American football player
- 1988 – Antonio Piccolo, Italian footballer
- 1988 – Ed Speleers, English actor and producer
- 1989 – Franco Di Santo, Argentinian footballer
- 1989 – Mitchell Pearce, Australian rugby league player
- 1989 – Teddy Riner, French judoka
- 1990 – Nickel Ashmeade, Jamaican sprinter
- 1990 – Anna Bogomazova, Russian-American kick-boxer, martial artist, and wrestler
- 1990 – Sorana Cîrstea, Romanian tennis player
- 1990 – Trent Cotchin, Australian footballer
- 1991 – Luka Milivojević, Serbian footballer
- 1991 – Anne-Marie, English singer-songwriter
- 1992 – Andreea Acatrinei, Romanian gymnast
- 1992 – Guilherme Negueba, Brazilian footballer
- 1993 – Ichinojō Takashi, Mongolian sumo wrestler
- 1994 – Johanna Allik, Estonian figure skater
- 1994 – Aaron Gray, Australian rugby league player
- 1994 – Josh Hader, American baseball player
- 1996 – Emerson Hyndman, American international soccer player
- 1997 – Rafaela Gómez, Ecuadorian tennis player

== Deaths ==
=== Pre-1600 ===
- AD 30 – Jesus Christ (possible date of the crucifixion) (born circa 4 BC)
- 821 – George the Standard-Bearer, archbishop of Mytilene (born c. 776)
- 924 – Berengar I of Italy (born 845)
- 1201 – Baha al-Din Qaraqush, regent of Egypt and builder of the Cairo Citadel
- 1206 – Frederick I, Duke of Lorraine
- 1340 – Bolesław Jerzy II of Mazovia (born 1308)
- 1498 – Charles VIII of France (born 1470)
- 1499 – Galeotto I Pico, Duke of Mirandola (born 1442)
- 1501 – Minkhaung II, king of Ava (born 1446)

=== 1601–1900 ===
- 1606 – The Jesuit Edward Oldcorne (born 1561) is executed at Worcester in the aftermath of the Gunpowder Plot.
- 1614 – El Greco, Greek-Spanish painter and sculptor (born 1541)
- 1638 – Shimazu Tadatsune, Japanese daimyō (born 1576)
- 1651 – Lennart Torstensson, Swedish field marshal and engineer (born 1603)
- 1658 – Juan Eusebio Nieremberg, Spanish mystic and philosopher (born 1595)
- 1661 – Sir William Brereton, 1st Baronet, English commander and politician (born 1604)
- 1663 – Francis Cooke, English-American settler (born 1583)
- 1668 – William Davenant, English poet and playwright (born 1606)
- 1719 – Jean-Baptiste de La Salle, French priest and saint, founded the Institute of the Brothers of the Christian Schools (born 1651)
- 1739 – Dick Turpin, English criminal (born 1705)
- 1747 – Leopold I, Prince of Anhalt-Dessau (born 1676)
- 1761 – Thomas Bayes, English minister and mathematician (born 1701)
- 1766 – Tiberius Hemsterhuis, Dutch philologist and critic (born 1685)
- 1767 – Franz Sparry, Austrian composer and director (born 1715)
- 1779 – Martha Ray, English singer (born 1746)
- 1782 – Taksin, Thai king (born 1734)
- 1789 – Abdul Hamid I, Ottoman sultan (born 1725)
- 1789 – Petrus Camper, Dutch physician, anatomist, and physiologist (born 1722)
- 1801 – Noël François de Wailly, French lexicographer and author (born 1724)
- 1804 – Toussaint Louverture, Haitian general (born 1743)
- 1811 – Garsevan Chavchavadze, Georgian diplomat and politician (born 1757)
- 1823 – Jacques Charles, French physicist and mathematician (born 1746)
- 1833 – Antoni Radziwiłł, Lithuanian composer and politician (born 1775)
- 1836 – William Godwin, English journalist and author (born 1756)
- 1849 – Pedro Ignacio de Castro Barros, Argentinian priest and politician (born 1777)
- 1850 – William Lisle Bowles, English poet and critic (born 1762)
- 1858 – Anton Diabelli, Austrian composer and publisher (born 1781)
- 1868 – Thomas D'Arcy McGee, Irish-Canadian journalist, activist, and politician (born 1825)
- 1871 – Prince Alexander John of Wales, British Prince.
- 1879 – Begum Hazrat Mahal, Begum of Awadh, was the second wife of Nawab Wajid Ali Shah (born 1820)
- 1884 – Maria Doolaeghe, Flemish novelist (born 1803)
- 1885 – Karl Theodor Ernst von Siebold, German physiologist and zoologist (born 1804)
- 1889 – Youssef Bey Karam, Lebanese soldier and politician (born 1823)
- 1889 – Sebastián Lerdo de Tejada, Mexican politician and president, 1872-1876 (born 1823)
- 1891 – P. T. Barnum, American businessman and politician, co-founded The Barnum & Bailey Circus (born 1810)

=== 1901–present ===
- 1917 – Spyridon Samaras, Greek composer and playwright (born 1861)
- 1918 – David Kolehmainen, Finnish wrestler (born 1885)
- 1918 – George E. Ohr, American potter (born 1857)
- 1920 – Karl Binding, German lawyer and jurist (born 1841)
- 1922 – James McGowen, Australian politician, 18th Premier of New South Wales (born 1855)
- 1928 – Alexander Bogdanov, Russian physician, philosopher, and author (born 1873)
- 1932 – Grigore Constantinescu, Romanian priest and journalist (born 1875)
- 1938 – Suzanne Valadon, French painter (born 1865)
- 1939 – Joseph Lyons, Australian educator and politician, 10th Prime Minister of Australia (born 1879)
- 1943 – Jovan Dučić, Serbian-American poet and diplomat (born 1871)
- 1943 – Alexandre Millerand, French lawyer and politician, 12th President of France (born 1859)
- 1947 – Henry Ford, American engineer and businessman, founded the Ford Motor Company (born 1863)
- 1949 – John Gourlay, Canadian soccer player (born 1872)
- 1950 – Walter Huston, Canadian-American actor and singer (born 1883)
- 1955 – Theda Bara, American actress (born 1885)
- 1956 – Fred Appleby, English runner (born 1879)
- 1960 – Henri Guisan, Swiss general (born 1874)
- 1965 – Roger Leger, Canadian ice hockey player (born 1919)
- 1966 – Walt Hansgen, American race car driver (born 1919)
- 1968 – Edwin Baker, Canadian co-founder of the Canadian National Institute for the Blind (CNIB) (born 1893)
- 1968 – Jim Clark, Scottish race car driver (born 1936)
- 1972 – Joe Gallo, American gangster (born 1929)
- 1972 – Abeid Karume, Tanzanian politician, 1st President of Zanzibar (born 1905)
- 1981 – Kit Lambert, English record producer and manager (born 1935)
- 1981 – Norman Taurog, American director and screenwriter (born 1899)
- 1982 – Harald Ertl, Austrian race car driver and journalist (born 1948)
- 1984 – Frank Church, American soldier, lawyer, and politician (born 1924)
- 1985 – Carl Schmitt, German philosopher and jurist (born 1888)
- 1986 – Leonid Kantorovich, Russian mathematician and economist (born 1912)
- 1990 – Ronald Evans, American captain, engineer, and astronaut (born 1933)
- 1991 – Memduh Ünlütürk, Turkish general (born 1913)
- 1992 – Ace Bailey, Canadian ice hockey player and coach (born 1903)
- 1992 – Antonis Tritsis, Greek high jumper and politician, 71st Mayor of Athens (born 1937)
- 1994 – Lee Brilleaux, English singer-songwriter and guitarist (born 1952)
- 1994 – Albert Guðmundsson, Icelandic footballer, manager, and politician (born 1923)
- 1994 – Golo Mann, German historian and author (born 1909)
- 1994 – Agathe Uwilingiyimana, Rwandan chemist, academic, and politician, Prime Minister of Rwanda (born 1953)
- 1995 – Philip Jebb, English architect and politician (born 1927)
- 1997 – Luis Aloma, Cuban-American baseball player (born 1923)
- 1997 – Georgy Shonin, Ukrainian-Russian general, pilot, and astronaut (born 1935)
- 1998 – Alex Schomburg, Puerto Rican painter and illustrator (born 1905)
- 1999 – Heinz Lehmann, German-Canadian psychiatrist and academic (born 1911)
- 2001 – David Graf, American actor (born 1950)
- 2001 – Beatrice Straight, American actress (born 1914)
- 2002 – John Agar, American actor (born 1921)
- 2003 – Cecile de Brunhoff, French pianist and author (born 1903)
- 2003 – David Greene, English-American actor, director, producer, and screenwriter (born 1921)
- 2004 – Victor Argo, American actor (born 1934)
- 2004 – Konstantinos Kallias, Greek politician (born 1901)
- 2005 – Cliff Allison, English race car driver (born 1932)
- 2005 – Grigoris Bithikotsis, Greek singer-songwriter (born 1922)
- 2005 – Bob Kennedy, American baseball player, coach, and manager (born 1920)
- 2005 – Melih Kibar, Turkish composer and educator (born 1951)
- 2007 – Johnny Hart, American author and illustrator (born 1931)
- 2007 – Barry Nelson, American actor (born 1917)
- 2008 – Ludu Daw Amar, Burmese journalist and author (born 1915)
- 2009 – Dave Arneson, American game designer, co-created Dungeons & Dragons (born 1947)
- 2011 – Pierre Gauvreau, Canadian painter (born 1922)
- 2012 – Steven Kanumba, Tanzanian actor and director (born 1984)
- 2012 – Satsue Mito, Japanese zoologist and academic (born 1914)
- 2012 – Ignatius Moses I Daoud, Syrian cardinal (born 1930)
- 2012 – David E. Pergrin, American colonel and engineer (born 1917)
- 2012 – Bashir Ahmed Qureshi, Pakistani politician (born 1959)
- 2012 – Mike Wallace, American television news journalist (born 1918)
- 2013 – Marty Blake, American businessman (born 1927)
- 2013 – Les Blank, American director and producer (born 1935)
- 2013 – Andy Johns, English-American record producer (born 1950)
- 2013 – Lilly Pulitzer, American fashion designer (born 1931)
- 2013 – Irma Ravinale, Italian composer and educator (born 1937)
- 2013 – Mickey Rose, American screenwriter (born 1935)
- 2013 – Carl Williams, American boxer (born 1959)
- 2014 – George Dureau, American painter and photographer (born 1930)
- 2014 – James Alexander Green, American-English mathematician and academic (born 1926)
- 2014 – V. K. Murthy, Indian cinematographer (born 1923)
- 2014 – Zeituni Onyango, Kenyan-American computer programmer (born 1952)
- 2014 – John Shirley-Quirk, English opera singer (born 1931)
- 2014 – George Shuffler, American guitarist (born 1925)
- 2014 – Josep Maria Subirachs, Spanish sculptor and painter (born 1927)
- 2014 – Royce Waltman, American basketball player and coach (born 1942)
- 2015 – Tim Babcock, American soldier and politician, 16th Governor of Montana (born 1919)
- 2015 – José Capellán, Dominican-American baseball player (born 1981)
- 2015 – Stan Freberg, American puppeteer, voice actor, and singer (born 1926)
- 2015 – Richard Henyekane, South African footballer (born 1983)
- 2015 – Geoffrey Lewis, American actor (born 1935)
- 2017 – Nicolae Șerban Tanașoca, Romanian historian and philologist (born 1941)
- 2019 – Seymour Cassel, American actor (born 1935)
- 2020 – John Prine, American country folk singer-songwriter (born 1946)
- 2020 – Herb Stempel, American television personality (born 1926)
- 2021 – Tommy Raudonikis, Australian rugby league player and coach (born 1950)
- 2023 – Ben Ferencz, American lawyer (born 1920)
- 2023 – Philippe Bouvatier, French cyclist (born 1964)
- 2024 – Jerry Grote, American baseball player (born 1942)
- 2024 – Joe Kinnear, Irish football player and manager (born 1946)
- 2025 – William Finn, American composer and lyricist (born 1952)
- 2025 – Greg Millen, Canadian ice hockey player and sportscaster (born 1957)
- 2026 – Mircea Lucescu, Romanian football player and manager (born 1945)

== Holidays and observances ==
- Christian feast days:
  - Aibert of Crespin
  - Blessed Alexander Rawlins
  - Blessed Edward Oldcorne and Blessed Ralph Ashley
  - Brynach
  - Hegesippus
  - Henry Walpole
  - Hermann Joseph
  - Jean-Baptiste de La Salle
  - Blessed Maria Assunta Pallotta
  - Patriarch Tikhon of Moscow (Eastern Orthodox Church, Episcopal Church (USA))
  - April 7 (Eastern Orthodox liturgics)
- Flag Day (Slovenia)
- Women's Day (Mozambique)
- World Health Day (International observance)
