= Catholic Church in the United Kingdom =

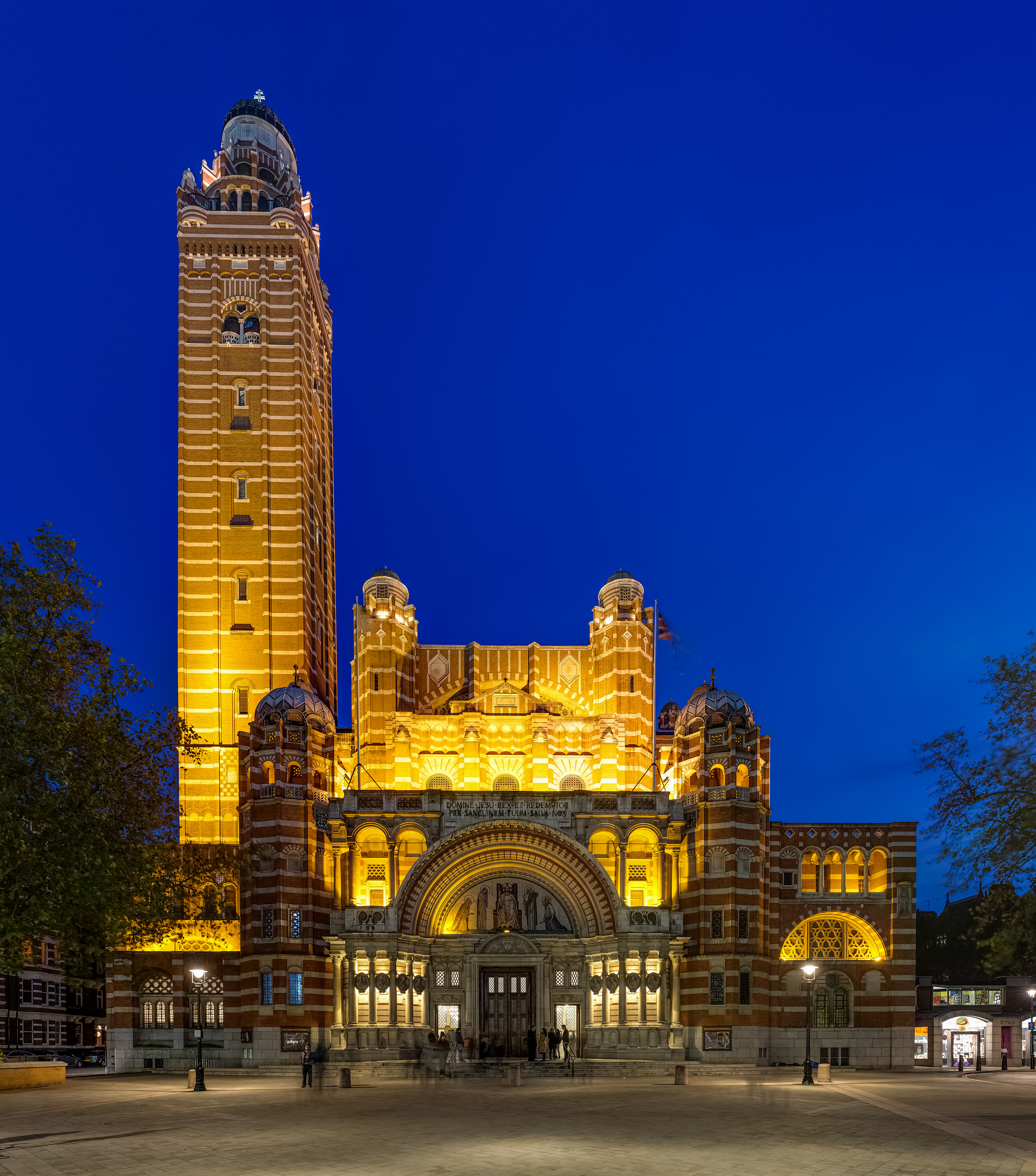
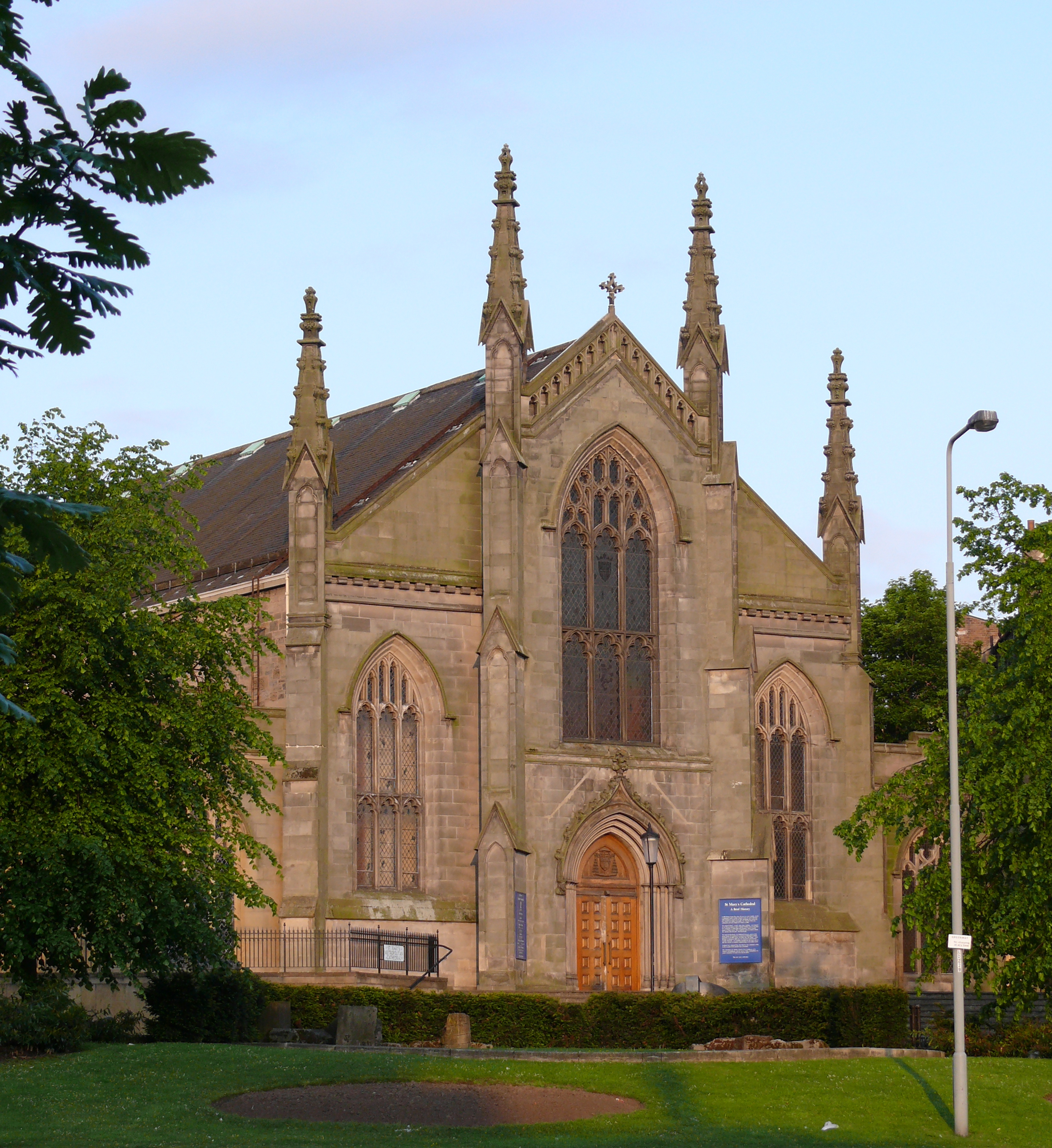
Westminster Cathedral, London (left) and St Mary's Cathedral, Edinburgh (right), the Catholic mother churches of England and Wales, and Scotland respectively.

In the United Kingdom, the Catholic Church is organised into the Catholic churches in England and Wales, Scotland, and with Northern Ireland organised as part of the Catholic Church in Ireland, all as part of the worldwide Catholic Church in communion with the Bishop of Rome (the pope). While there is no ecclesiastical jurisdiction corresponding to the United Kingdom as a whole, this article refers to the Catholic Church's geographical representation in Great Britain and Northern Ireland, ever since the establishment of the Kingdom of Great Britain by the Acts of Union 1707, and later the United Kingdom.

== History ==
=== Anti-Catholicism ===
Starting with Pope Pius V's papal bull Regnans in Excelsis in 1570 and lasting until 1766, popes did not recognise the legitimacy of the English monarchy and called for its overthrow. The Crown and government responded by treating Catholics as suspect. By the time of the creation of the Kingdom of Great Britain in 1707, Catholics were discriminated against in England and Scotland in significant ways: in all the kingdoms of the British Isles, they were excluded from voting, from sitting in Parliament, and from the learned professions. These discriminatory laws continued after the Acts of Union 1800, which created the new United Kingdom of Great Britain and Ireland in 1801. At that time, Catholic emancipation was gathering support but was not yet a reality, particularly in Ireland, where the Protestant Ascendancy was still in full force.

The Treaty of Union of 1707, like the Act of Settlement, had stated that no "Papist" could succeed to the throne. Restrictions on the civil rights of Catholics only began to change with the passing of the Papists Act 1778, which allowed them to own property, inherit land and join the British Army, although even this measure resulted in the backlash of the Gordon Riots of 1780, showing the depth of continuing anti-Catholic feeling.

=== Emancipation ===
After 1790, a new mood emerged as thousands of Catholics fled the French Revolution and Britain was allied in the Napoleonic Wars with the Catholic states of Portugal and Spain as well as with the Holy See itself. By 1829, the political climate had changed enough to allow Parliament to pass the Roman Catholic Relief Act 1829, giving Catholics almost equal civil rights, including the right to vote and to hold most public offices.

The Catholic Church in England included about 50,000 people in traditional ("recusant") Catholic families. They generally kept a low profile and were concentrated in Northern England. Their priests usually came from St Edmund's College, a seminary founded in 1793 by English refugees from the French revolution. The main disabilities, as referenced above, were lifted by the Catholic Relief Act 1829. In 1850 the pope restored the Catholic hierarchy, giving England its own Catholic bishops again. In 1869 a new seminary opened.

Another, larger group comprised very poor Irish immigrants escaping the Great Irish Famine. Their numbers rose from 224,000 in 1841 to 419,000 in 1851, concentrated in ports and industrial districts as well as industrial districts in Scotland. A third group included well-known converts from the Church of England, most notably the intellectuals John Henry Newman and Henry Edward Manning (1808–1892). Manning became the second Archbishop of Westminster. The next most prominent leader was Herbert Vaughan (1832–1903), who succeeded Manning as Archbishop of Westminster in 1892 and was elevated to the cardinalate in 1893.

Manning was among the strongest supporters of the pope and especially of the doctrine of papal infallibility. In contrast, Newman acknowledged this doctrine but thought it might not be prudent to define it formally at the time. Manning promoted a modern Catholic view of social justice. These views are reflected in the papal encyclical Rerum novarum issued by Pope Leo XIII, which became the foundation of modern Catholic social justice teaching. Catholic parochial schools, subsidised by the government, were set up in urban areas to serve the largely Irish element. Manning spoke for the Irish Catholic labourers and helped settle the London dock strike of 1889. He gained acclaim for building a new cathedral in Westminster and for encouraging the growth of religious congregations largely filled by the Irish.

=== Converts ===
A number of prominent individuals have converted to the Catholic Church, including Edmund Campion, Margaret Clitherow, Charles II, James II and VII, John Henry Newman, Henry Edward Manning, Robert Hugh Benson, Augustus Pugin, Evelyn Waugh, Muriel Spark, Gerard Manley Hopkins, Siegfried Sassoon, G. K. Chesterton, Ronald Knox, Graham Greene, Malcolm Muggeridge, Kenneth Clark, and Joseph Pearce. Members of the royal family such as Katharine, Duchess of Kent, who in 1994 became the first royal family member to convert to Catholicism since 1685, and former Prime Minister Sir Tony Blair have also converted to the Catholic Church, in Blair's case in December 2007 after he had left office.

Since the establishment of the Personal Ordinariate of Our Lady of Walsingham, over 3,000 former Anglicans have been received into the Catholic Church by this path.

== Organisation ==
There are 38 ecclesiastical circumscriptions and 3,104 parishes.

=== Statistics ===
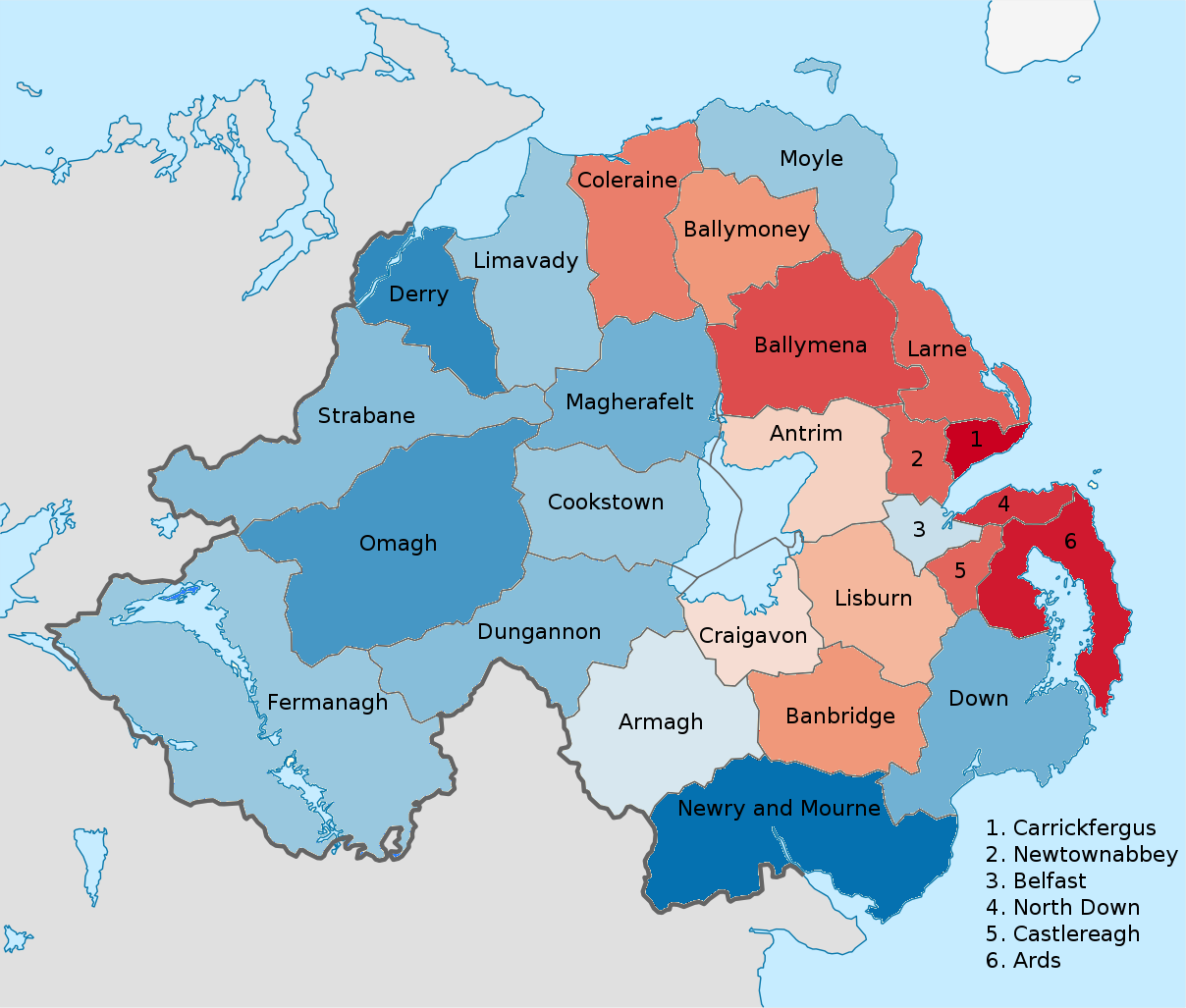
Districts of Northern Ireland by predominant religion at the 2011 census. Blue is Catholic and red is Protestant.

In 2011, in total there were roughly 5.7 million Catholics (9.1%) in the United Kingdom: 4,155,100 in England and Wales (7.4%), 841,053 in Scotland (15.9%), and 738,033 in Northern Ireland (40.76%). Later censuses recorded the Catholic share of the population at 13.3% in Scotland in 2022, and at 42.3% in Northern Ireland in 2021, the first census in which more people identified as Catholic than Protestant there.

In large parts of Northern Ireland, Catholicism is the dominant religion. Also in a few Scottish council areas Catholics outnumber other religions, including in the most populous one: Catholics outnumber members of the Church of Scotland in Glasgow City (27% versus 23%). Other council areas in which Catholics outnumber members of the Church of Scotland are North Lanarkshire, Inverclyde, and West Dunbartonshire, according to the 2011 Scottish Census. In England and Wales, the Census question about religion does not specify denominations beyond simply "Christian" - however Church estimates suggest the Catholic population in the Archdiocese of Liverpool (which covers the eponymous city and its hinterland) is approximately 500,000, or about 27% of local residents.

In 2011 according to a YouGov poll, 70% of British Catholics believed a woman should be able to have an abortion. Some 90% of Catholic worshippers supported contraceptives being widely available. According to a 2015 YouGov poll, 50% of religious British Catholics supported same-sex marriage and 40% opposed it. According to a Pew Research Center poll 78% of UK Catholics support same-sex marriage while 21% oppose it. The same poll maintains that 86% of UK Catholics believe society should accept homosexuality, while 12% believe society should not accept homosexuality.

== Catholic saints of the United Kingdom ==
Saints and Doctors of the Church, notable and Pre-Reformation:

- Alban (d. 251 or 304), protomartyr
- David (500–589), monk, bishop, and teacher
- Patrick (late 5th century), missionary, 'Apostle to Ireland'
- Augustine of Canterbury (d. 605), Professed Religious Priest of the Order of St Benedict, bishop
- Padarn, early 6th century, bishop
- Cuthbert (c. 634–687), missionary and bishop
- Æthelthryth (c. 636–679), Anglo-Saxon princess
- Bede (672?–735), Professed Religious Priest of the Order of St Benedict, Doctor of the Church
- Dunstan (909–988), abbot, bishop, archbishop
- Edward the Confessor (1003–1066), king
- Anselm (1033–1109), Professed Religious Priest of the Order of St Benedict, archbishop, Doctor of the Church
- Thomas Becket (1118–1170), bishop and martyr
- Richard of Chichester (1197–1253), bishop
- Simon Stock (1165–1265), Carmelite Friar

Saints from the period of the Reformation to the present:

- John Fisher – (1469–1535), Bishop of Rochester; Cardinal
- Thomas More – (1478–1535), Married Layperson of the Archdiocese of Westminster
- John Houghton – (1487–1535), Professed Priest of the Carthusians
- Robert Lawrence – (d. 1535), Professed Priest of the Carthusians
- Augustine Webster – (d. 1535), Professed Priest of the Carthusians
- Richard Reynolds – (d. 1535), Professed Priest of the Carthusians
- John Stone – (d. 1539), Professed Priest of the Augustinians
- Cuthbert Mayne – (1544–1577), Priest of the Apostolic Vicariate of England
- Edmund Campion – (1540–1581), Professed Priest of the Jesuits
- Ralph Sherwin – (1550–1581), Priest of the Apostolic Vicariate of England
- Alexander Briant – (1556–1581), Professed Priest of the Jesuits
- John Paine – (d. 1582), Priest of the Apostolic Vicariate of England
- Luke Kirby – (1549–1582), Priest of the Apostolic Vicariate of England
- Richard Gwyn – (1537–1584), Married Layperson of the Apostolic Vicariate of England
- Margaret Clitherow née Middleton – (1550–1586), Married Layperson of the Apostolic Vicariate of England
- Margaret Ward – (d. 1588), Layperson of the Apostolic Vicariate of England
- Edmund Gennings – (1567–1591), Priest of the Apostolic Vicariate of England
- Swithun Wells – (1536–1591), Priest of the Apostolic Vicariate of England
- Eustace White – (d. 1591), Priest of the Apostolic Vicariate of England
- Polydore Plasden – (d. 1591), Priest of the Apostolic Vicariate of England
- John Boste – (1543–1582), Priest of the Apostolic Vicariate of England
- Robert Southwell – (1561–1595), Professed Priest of the Jesuits
- Henry Walpole – (1558–1595), Professed Priest of the Jesuits
- Philip Howard – (1557–1595), Married Layperson of the Apostolic Vicariate of England
- John Jones – (1559–1598), Professed Priest of the Franciscan Friars Minor (Observants)
- John Rigby – (d. 1600), Layperson of the Apostolic Vicariate of England
- Anne Line née Higham – (1565–1601), Married Layperson of the Apostolic Vicariate of England
- Nicholas Owen – (1550–1606), Professed Priest of the Jesuits
- Thomas Garnet – (1575–1608), Professed Priest of the Jesuits
- John Roberts – (1576–1610), Professed Priest of the Benedictines
- John Almond – (1577–1612), Priest of the Apostolic Vicariate of England
- John Ogilvie – (1579–1615), Professed Priest of the Jesuits
- Edmund Arrowsmith – (1585–1628), Professed Priest of the Jesuits
- Edward Barlow – (1585–1641), Professed Priest of the Benedictines
- Bartholomew Roe – (1583–1642), Professed Priest of the Benedictines
- Henry Morse – (1595–1645), Professed Priest of the Jesuits
- John Southworth – (1592–1654), Priest of the Apostolic Vicariate of England
- William Plessington – (1637–1679), Priest of the Apostolic Vicariate of England
- Philip Evans – (1645–1679), Professed Priest of the Jesuits
- John Lloyd – (1630–1679), Priest of the Apostolic Vicariate of England
- John Henry Newman – (1801–1890), Professed Priest of the Oratory, Theologian, Philosopher, Cardinal
- John Wall – (1620–1679), Professed Priest of the Franciscan Friars Minor (Recollects)
- John Kemble – (1599–1679), Priest of the Apostolic Vicariate of England
- David Lewis – (1616–1679), Professed Priest of the Jesuits

Blesseds

- Margaret Pole – (1473–1541), Martyr, Countess of Salisbury
- Dominic Barberi – (1792–1849), Professed Priest of the Passionists
- Ralph Crockett – (1550–1588), Seminary Priest and Martyr

Venerables

- Mary Potter – (1847–1913), Founder of the Little Company of Mary
- Margaret Sinclair – (1900–1925), Professed Religious of the Poor Clare Colettine Nuns
- Joan Ward – (1585–1645), Founder of the Institute of the Blessed Virgin Mary (Loreto Sisters) and Congregatio Iesu
- Elizabeth Prout – (1820–1864), Founder of the Sisters of the Cross and the Passion
- George Spencer – (1799–1864), Professed Priest of the Passionists

Servants of God

- James II and VII, King of England, Scots, and Ireland, founder and namesake of Jacobitism
- Margaret Hallahan – (1802–1868), Founder of the Dominican Sisters of the English Congregation of Saint Catherine of Siena
- Frances Taylor – (1832–1900), Founder of the Poor Servants of the Mother of God
- Teresa Helena Higginson – (1844–1905), Layperson of the Archdiocese of Liverpool

== See also ==
- Catholic schools in the United Kingdom
- List of Catholic dioceses in Great Britain
- List of Catholic dioceses in the United Kingdom
- List of Catholic churches in the United Kingdom
- State visit by Pope Benedict XVI to the United Kingdom

=== England and Wales ===
- English Reformation
- List of English cardinals
- List of monastic houses in England
- List of monastic houses in Wales

=== Scotland ===
- Scottish Reformation
- List of monastic houses in Scotland

=== Ireland (including Northern Ireland) ===
- List of Catholic dioceses in Ireland
- Reformation in Ireland
- List of Catholic churches in Ireland
- List of monastic houses in Ireland
