= Gennings =

Gennings is a surname. Notable people with the surname include:

- Edmund Gennings (1567–1591), English Roman Catholic saint
- John Gennings (c. 1570–1660), English martyr, brother of Edmund

Given name

- Gennings Dunker (born 2003), American football player

== See also ==
- Jennings
