= Polydore Plasden =

English Roman Catholic priest, martyr and saint

Saint Polydore Plasden
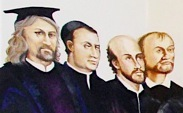
- Detail from a mural in the English Martyrs Parish in Derby. All martyrs shown died on 10 December 1591. From left to right: Saint Swithun Wells, Saint Edmund Gennings, Saint Eustace White, and Saint Polydore Plasden.

Priest and Martyr
- Born: c. 1563; London, England
- Died: 10 December 1591 (aged 27 – 28); Tyburn, London, England
- Beatified: 15 December 1929 by Pope Pius XI
- Canonized: 25 October 1970 by Pope Paul VI
- Feast: 10 December (individual), 25 October (collectively with Forty Martyrs of England and Wales)

Polydore Plasden (1563–1591) was one of the Catholic Forty Martyrs of England and Wales. A native of London, he studied for the priesthood at Rheims and Rome, and was ordained in 1586 before being sent back to England soon after.

== Life ==
Polydore Plasden was born in 1563, the son of a London horner. He was educated at the Rheims, and at the English College at Rome, where he was ordained priest on 7 December 1586. He remained at Rome for more than a year, and then was at Rheims from 8 April until 2 September 1588, when he was sent on the mission. While at Rome he had signed a petition for the retention of the Jesuits as superiors of the English College, but in England he was considered to have suffered injury through their agency. Plasden ministered in Sussex and in London from 1588 to 1591.

On 2 November 1591, he was captured by priest hunter Richard Topcliffe at the house of Swithun Wells on Gray's Inn Lane, a centre of hospitality for recusants, where Edmund Gennings was celebrating Mass. As Topcliffe and his men attempted to break in, some of the congregation held the door closed until the Mass concluded, at which point they surrendered peacefully. Wells was not present, but he and his wife, along with Sydney Hodgson, and John Mason (with the possible exception of Brian Lacey) were condemned as traitors. Mrs. Wells was reprieved, and died in prison in 1602.

On 6 December, together with Edmund Gennings and Eustace White (priests), and Sydney Hodgson, Swithun Wells, and John Mason (laymen), he was tried before the King's Bench, and condemned for coming into England contrary to the Jesuits, etc. Act 1584.

All were executed on the same day: Gennings and Wells opposite the house of the latter at Gray's Inn Lane; Plasden, White, Hodgson, and Mason at Tyburn. At his execution on 10 December 1591, Plasden acknowledged Elizabeth as his lawful queen, whom he would defend to the best of his power against all her enemies, and he prayed for her and the whole realm, but said that he would rather forfeit a thousand lives than deny or fight against his religion. Sentenced to be hanged, drawn, and quartered, Sir Walter Raleigh ordered that he be allowed to hang till he was dead, to spare him the suffering that followed.

He was beatified in 1929, and was canonized in 1970 by Pope Paul VI as one of the Forty Martyrs of England and Wales.
