= Sydney Hodgson =

English Roman Catholic lawyer and martyr

Sydney Hodgson (died 10 December 1591) was an English Roman Catholic lawyer, beatified by the Catholic Church as a martyr in 1929.

== Life ==
He was a Catholic convert. In 1591, while Edmund Gennings was saying Mass at the house of Swithin Wells in London, the pursuivant Topcliffe and his assistants broke into the house just at the moment of consecration. On this account alone, their entrance into the room was obstructed by some of the male members of the congregation, including Sydney Hodgson, until the conclusion of the Mass; these men then surrendered themselves.

Hodgson and the others were brought to trial on 4 December 1591, the charge against him being merely that of receiving and relieving priests, and of being reconciled to the Church of Rome. He was offered his life if he would give some sort of a promise of occasional conformity to the Church of England. He was condemned and executed at Tyburn on 10 December.
