= Eustace White =

English saint and martyr

Saint Eustace White
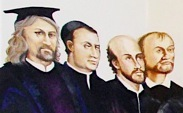
- Detail from a mural in the English Martyrs Parish in Derby. All martyrs who died on 10 December 1591. From left to right: Saints Swithun Wells, Edmund Gennings, Eustace White, and Polydore Plasden.

Martyr
- Born: c. 1559; Louth, England
- Died: 10 December 1591 (aged 31 - 32); Tyburn, London, England
- Venerated in: Roman Catholic Church
- Beatified: 15 December 1929 by Pope Pius XI
- Canonized: 25 October 1970 by Pope Paul VI
- Feast: 10 December (individual); 25 October (with the Forty Martyrs of England and Wales); 29 October (one of the Douai Martyrs)
- Attributes: martyr's palm, noose in neck, crucifix

Eustace White (1559 - 1591) was a Catholic priest. Due to his service, he was put on trial in December 1591 and subsequently hanged, drawn and quartered at Tyburn on 10 December 1591, along with another priest and three laymen. He is one of the Forty Martyrs of England and Wales and was canonised by Pope Paul VI in 1970.

== Life ==
Born in Louth, Lincolnshire, in 1559, he converted to the Roman Catholic Church in 1584 and was disowned by his father. He travelled to Europe to study for the priesthood and was ordained, probably at the Venerable English College, Rome, in 1588. He returned to England for his ministry later that year - the year of the Spanish Armada. He thus began his ministry just as the anti-Catholic feeling was reaching fever pitch.

=== Martyrdom ===
A conversation with a fellow traveller led to his arrest in Dorset three years later in 1591. White put up a very articulate defence in the West Country, but was subsequently sent to London and imprisoned in Bridewell Prison. In October 1591 the Privy Council authorised the use of torture on White.

A letter from him still survives, written a few weeks before his execution, and is addressed to Father Henry Garnet from prison, on 23 November 1591:

"The morrow after Simon and Jude's day I was hanged at the wall from the ground, my manacles fast locked into a staple as high as I could reach upon a stool: the stool taken away where I hanged from a little after 8 o'clock in the morning until after 4 in the afternoon, without any ease or comfort at all, saving that Topcliffe came in and told me that the Spaniards were come into Southwark by our means: 'For lo, do you not hear the drums' (for then the drums played in honour of the Lord Mayor). The next day after also I was hanged up an hour or two: such is the malicious minds of our adversaries."

He was put on trial in December 1591 and subsequently hanged, drawn and quartered at Tyburn on 10 December 1591, along with another priest and three laymen.

Before being executed, he forgave Topcliffe his cruelties, and prayed for him, and at his execution, he told the people that his only treason was his priesthood, and thanked God for the happy crown to his labours. Being cut down alive, he rose to his feet, but was tripped up and dragged to the fire where two men stood upon his arms while the executioner butchered him.

== Veneration ==
There is a stained glass window of Saint Eustace White in St. Mary's Catholic Church in Louth, where the martyr was born.

A book entitled Saint Eustace White: Elizabethan Priest and Martyr was written by Mark Vickers.
