= John Gennings =

Englishman (c.1570–1660)

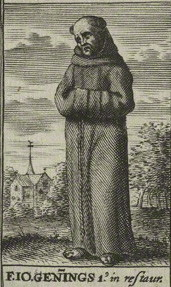
- Born: 1570
- Occupation: Monk

John Gennings (c. 1570 – 12 November 1660) was an Englishman who was converted to Catholicism through the martyrdom of his elder brother Saint Edmund Gennings during the English Reformation. He restored the English province of Franciscan friars. His name is sometimes spelled Jennings.

== Martyrdom of Edmund Gennings ==
Edmund Gennings converted to Catholicism at the age of about sixteen, and soon after went to Rheims to study for the priesthood. On returning to England, he met his younger brother, John, near Ludgate Hill, and spoke to him without disclosing his identity. He said merely that he was a kinsman, and asked the young man what had become of his brother Edmund. John told him that "He had heard he was gone to Rome to the Pope, and was become a notable Papist and a traitor both to God and his country, and that if he did return he would be hanged infallibly." Edmund, not judging the time right to begin an attempt at converting his brother, told him who he was, but without mentioning his priesthood. The brothers separated soon after, and Edmund continued his short ministry until he was arrested on 7 November 1591, after saying Mass in the house of Swithun Wells at Gray's Inn. He was hanged, drawn, and quartered on 10 December, outside that house.

== Conversion of John Gennings ==
John Gennings, who subsequently wrote a Life of his brother, recounts his own conversion through his brother's martyrdom. On page 98, of the Life (which was published in 1614 at Saint-Omer), speaking of himself in the third person, he writes,

This martyr's brother, called John Genings, being in London at the very time of his brother's apprehension, condemnation, and execution, hearing of the same, rather rejoiced than any way bewailed the untimely and bloody end of his nearest kinsman, hoping thereby to be rid of all persuasions, which he mistrusted he should receive from him touching the Catholic religion. But about ten days after his execution, towards night, having spent all that day in sport and jollity, being weary with play, he resorted home, where, to repose himself, he went into a secret chamber. He was no sooner there set down, but forthwith his heart began to be heavy, and he began to weigh how idly he had spent that day. Amidst these thoughts there presently was represented to his mind a strange imagination and apprehension of the death of his brother, and amongst other things, how he had not long before forsaken all worldly pleasures and, for his religion only, endured intolerable torments. Then within himself he made long discourses concerning his religion and his brother's, comparing the Catholic manner of living with his, and finding the one to embrace pain and mortification, and the other to seek pleasure. the one to live strictly, and the other licentiously; the one to fear sin, the other to run into all kinds of sin. Upon this, being struck with exceeding terror and remorse, he wept bitterly, desiring God, after his fashion, to illuminate his understanding that he might see and perceive the truth. Oh! what great joy and consolation did he feel ath that instant; what reverence on the sudden did he begin to bear to the Blessed Virgin and to the Saints of God, which before he had never scarce heard tell of; what strange motions, as it were inspirations, with exceeding readiness of will to change his religion, took possession of his soul; and what a heavenly conceit had he now of his dear brother's felicity! He imagined he saw him; he thought he heard him. In this ecstasy of mind, he made a vow upon the spot, as he lay prostrate on the ground, To forsake kindred and country to find out the true knowledge of his brother's faith; which vow he soon after performed, and departed England without advertising any one of his friends, and went beyoned the seas to execute his promise.

Being received into the Church, he entered Douai College, was ordained as a priest in 1607, and the following year was sent upon the English mission. Here he conceived a wish for the restoration of the English province of Franciscans, and sought out Father William Staney, the Commissary of the English friars, and from him received the habit (became a Franciscan), either in 1610 or 1614 (the date is uncertain). After this, he went for a time to a convent of the Franciscan order at Ypres, in Flanders, where he was joined by several English companions, amongst whom was Christopher Davenport, known in religion as Franciscus a Sancta Clara, afterwards a famous controversialist. Thus was the foundation of a new English province laid, and Father William Staney recognising the zeal of John Gennings, now gave into his hands the seal of the old province of the English Observants.

== The Restoration of the English Franciscans ==
Gennings next proceeded to procure a house for the English friars at Gravelines, but in 1618 he obtained leave from the minister general to establish a settlement at Douai. As a matter of fact, most of the friars who had joined Gennings were graduates of Douai College, and in transferring the residence to that town he hoped to obtain a continuous supply of recruits.

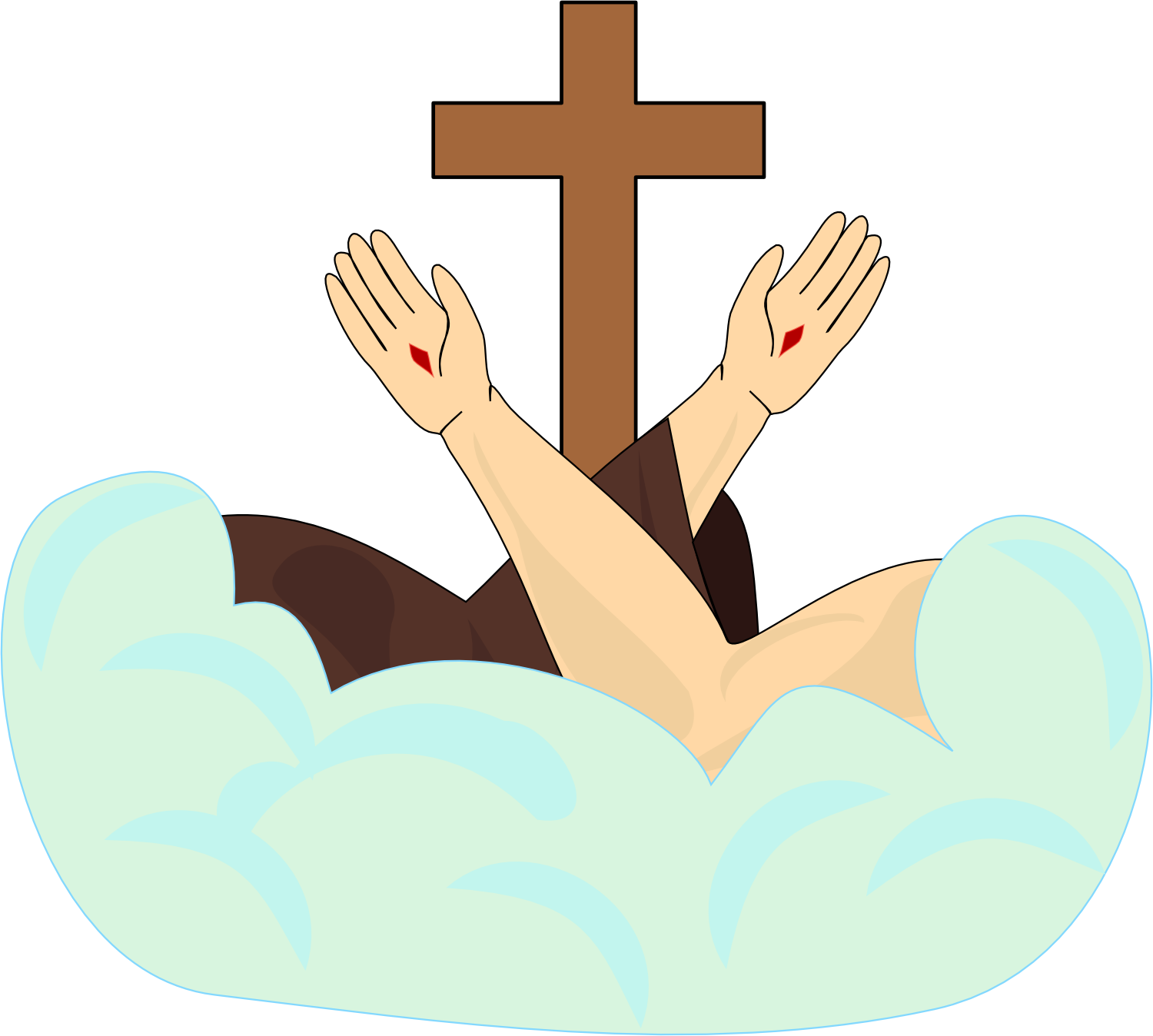
Franciscan Crest

The work of restoring the English province was definitely entrusted to him by the general chapter of 1618, and he was nominated "Vicar of England". To assist him in the work of restoration, the commissary general of the Belgian nation was empowered to gather together all the English and Scottish friars from any province in the order. A decree of the same general chapter placed the English Poor Clares of Gravelines under the jurisdiction of English friars.

=== Custos ===
In 1625, the number of the English friars having greatly increased, Gennings sent Father Franciscus a Sancta Clara to Rome to plead (to provide an argument for) that the English province be canonically established (i.e. accepted according to Canon law). The request was granted with the simple restriction that the superior of the province should not assume the title of provincial, but that of custos.

=== Establishment of the Convent at Taunton ===
In 1629, this restriction was taken away and Friar John Gennings was appointed minister provincial. The first chapter of the new province was held at Brussels in Advent (roughly, December) of the same year, in the convent of the English sisters of the third order, which Gennings had himself founded in 1619. This community of tertiary sisters was established at Taunton, in England, with a branch house at Woodchester. Father John Gennings was re-elected provincial in 1634, and again in 1643. John Gennings died in Douai on 12 November 1660.

== Notes ==
1. Catholic Where Catholic is used in the article it refers to Roman Catholic. Catholic (on its own) has been mainly used in the article to aid the flow and to remain true to the primary source.
2. Franciscans More correctly, Order of Friars Minor
3. Observants. There are various branches of the Franciscan order. The central point of division over the ages was the extent to which the austere (severe?) regime laid down by Francis need be followed. There was usually a distinction made by those followers who wished to retain the austerity of Francis, the Observants were such a group. See Franciscans for a wider treatment of this and a description of Francis' Testament
4. Custos, A superior in the Franciscan order, also used in England as guardian.
5. Sisters of the Third Order The Sisters have traditionally divided into two branches, one an enclosed contemplative order, the other, the Third Order, an 'open' order who undertook such work as teaching, nursing, or the Missions. They should not be confused with the male Third Order, which Francis created for those of his followers who could not leave their homes.
6. Wider View See Franciscan Order in modern times for a wider view of which this English Restoration is but a part.

== Sources ==
- Richard Challoner: Memoirs of Missionary Priests
