= Alexander Rawlins =

English Roman Catholic priest and martyr

Blessed Alexander Rawlins
- Born: 1560; Oxford, England
- Died: 7 April 1595; York, England
- Venerated in: Roman Catholicism
- Beatified: 15 December 1929, Rome by Pope Pius XI
- Feast: 7 April

Alexander Rawlins (1560 - 7 April 1595) was an English Roman Catholic martyr, beatified in 1929.

== Life ==
While Richard Challoner says that Rawlins was born somewhere on the border between Worcestershire and Gloucestershire, Rawlins stated to the examiners that he was born a Catholic in the city of Oxford. He went to school in Winchester before continuing his studies at Hart Hall at Oxford. He then went to London where he apprenticed himself to an apothecary.

In June 1586, he was arrested for the second time, with Swithun Wells, a known Catholic sympathizer, and seminarian Christopher Dryland and imprisoned in Newgate. After imprisonment, he was banished as "an obstinate Papist". Sailing from Southampton he landed at Saint-Malo and proceeded to Picardy. He travelled widely, mostly on foot, going to Rome and Paris before arriving at Reims, where he entered the college in December 1587. Rawlins was ordained a priest at Soissons on 18 March 1590 and sent on the English mission on 9 April. He arrived in England as a missioner with Edmund Gennings and Hugh Sewell. His mother's maiden name was Yeale, and Rawlins sometimes went by the alias "Francis Yeale".

Rawlins worked in York and Durham. On Christmas Day 1594 he was arrested at Winston, Durham. In the spring of 1595, he was in York awaiting trial, where he was joined by Henry Walpole. On Monday 7 April they were both hanged, drawn and quartered at Knavesmire. Rawlins was put to death first. The hangmen would have cut him down to be disembowelled alive, but they were stayed by a gentleman on horseback who made them wait until Rawlins was dead, and then lower the rope so his body should not fall.

His feast is 7 April.

== Sources ==
- Matthew Bunson, Margaret Bunson, Stephen Bunson (2003), Our Sunday Visitor's encyclopedia of saints, p. 65.
