= Brian J. Doyle =

American convicted sex offender

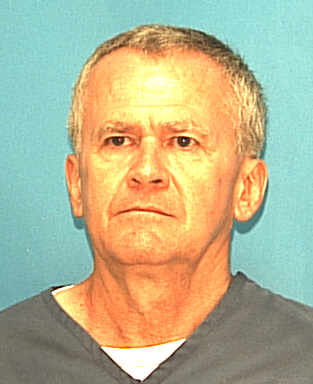
- Mug shot of Doyle
- Born: April 7, 1950 (age 76); United States
- Occupation: Former Deputy Press Secretary
- Status: Released
- Conviction: Attempted solicitation of a child for sex
- Penalty: Imprisonment of five years, probation of ten years

Brian James Doyle (born April 7, 1950) is a former Deputy Press Secretary for the United States Department of Homeland Security. In 2006, he was indicted for seducing a 14-year-old girl, who was actually a sheriff's deputy working undercover, on the internet. He was arrested on April 4, 2006, at his home in Silver Spring, Maryland. Five months later, he pled no contest. On November 17, 2006, he was sentenced to five years in prison with ten years of probation, and he was registered as a sex offender. Doyle was incarcerated at Wakulla Correctional Institution Annex outside of Tallahassee, Florida. He was released from prison on January 15, 2011.

== See also ==
- John Atchison
- List of federal political sex scandals in the United States
