= Melissanthi =

Greek poet, teacher and journalist

Melissanthi (Greek: Μελισσάνθη) was the pen name used by Eve Chougia-Skandalaki (Greek: Ήβη Κούγια - Σκανδαλάκη; April 8, 1910 – November 9, 1991), a Greek poet, teacher and journalist. Some sources say that she died in 1990. Her first name also appears as Ivi or Hebe; her surname also appears as Koúyia or Koughia.

She was born Eve Chougia in Athens and studied music, drawing, ballet and classical dance. From 1923 to 1924, she was in a Swiss sanitarium recovering from tuberculosis. She studied French, German and English at institutes in Athens. She went on to teach French in Athens high schools. She also contributed critical essays to newspapers and literary journals. In 1932, she married Giannes Skandalákis (Greek: Ιωάννη Σκανδαλάκη).

Her first poetry collection Phōnes entomou (Insect voices) was published in 1930. She went on to publish ten poetry collections. A collection of her poetry Ta poiimata tis Melissanthis 1930-1974 (The poems of Melissanthi) was published in 1976. She also wrote a children's play O mikros adhelfos (The little brother), which received the Sikiaridio Prize. She translated the works of foreign poets such as Robert Frost, Emily Dickinson and Rainer Maria Rilke into Greek.

Her early poetry draws its inspiration from religious themes; later poems are influenced by existential concepts.

Awards that she received include:

- an Athens Academy Award in 1936 for O gyrismos tou asotou
- a Palamas Honourable Mention in 1945 for Lyriki Exomologisi
- a State Prize for Poetry in 1965
- a Gold Cross of the Order of Deeds of Merit in 1965

== Selected works ==
- Profiteies (Prophecies) (1931, 1940)
- O gyrismos tou asotou (Return of the prodigal) (1935)
- Lyriki Exomologisi (Lyrical confessions) (1945)
- Anthropino Schima (Human shape) (1961)
- To fragma tis Siopis (The barrier of silence) (1965)
