= Hindrek Kesler =

Estonian architect

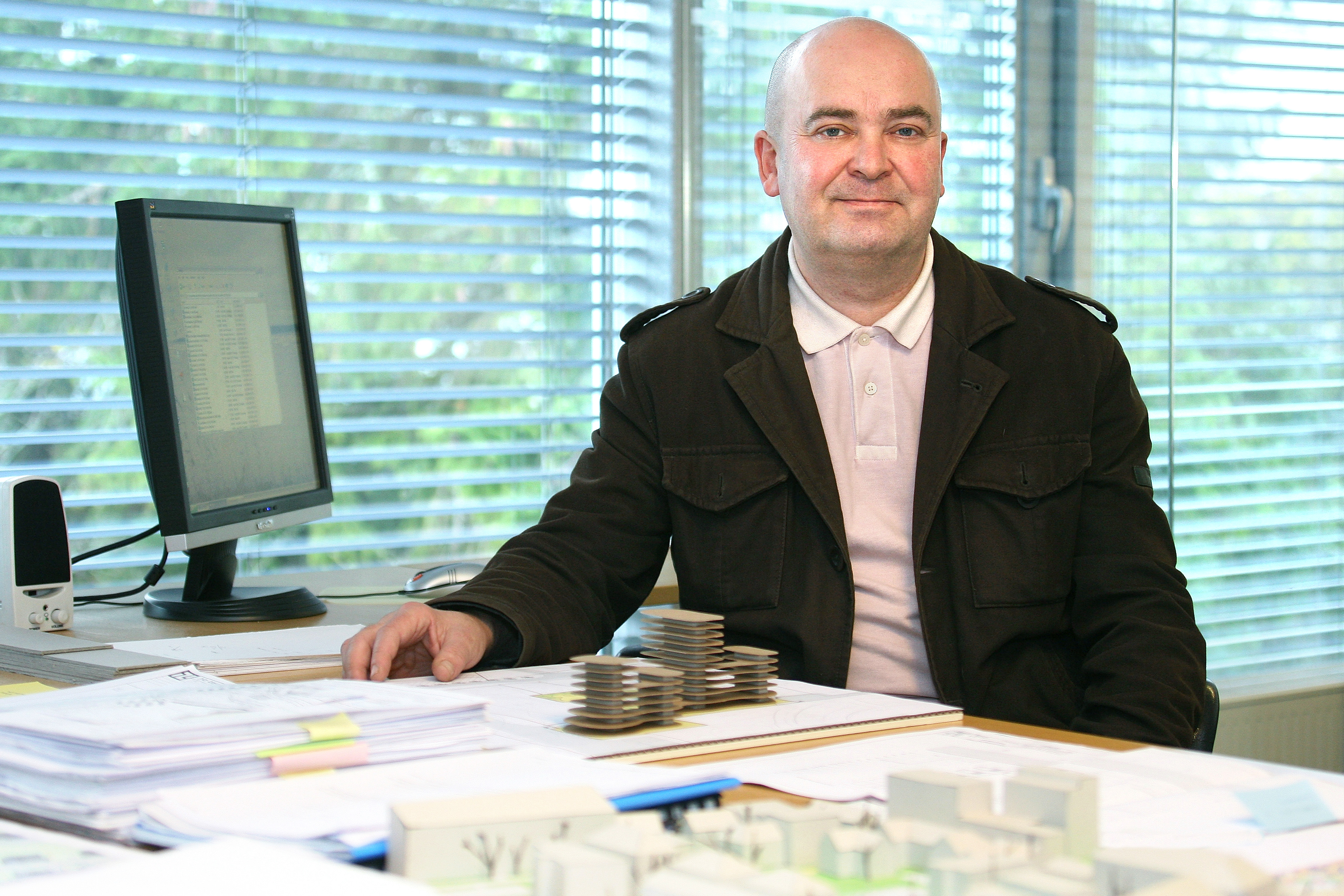
Hindrek Kesler in 2008

Hindrek Kesler (born 7 April 1958) is an Estonian architect.

Kesler was born in Kiviõli. He graduated from the State Art Institute of the Estonian SSR in 1981.

Hindrek Kesler works in the architectural bureau Zero OÜ.

== Works ==
- bus station of Sillamäe, 1998
- Estonian Gymnasium in Sillamäe, 2001
- office building in Mustamäe, 2002
- office building of the Luku-Expert company, 2006
- office of the architectural bureau Zero OÜ, 2007
