= Konstantinos Kallias =

Greek politician (1901–2004)

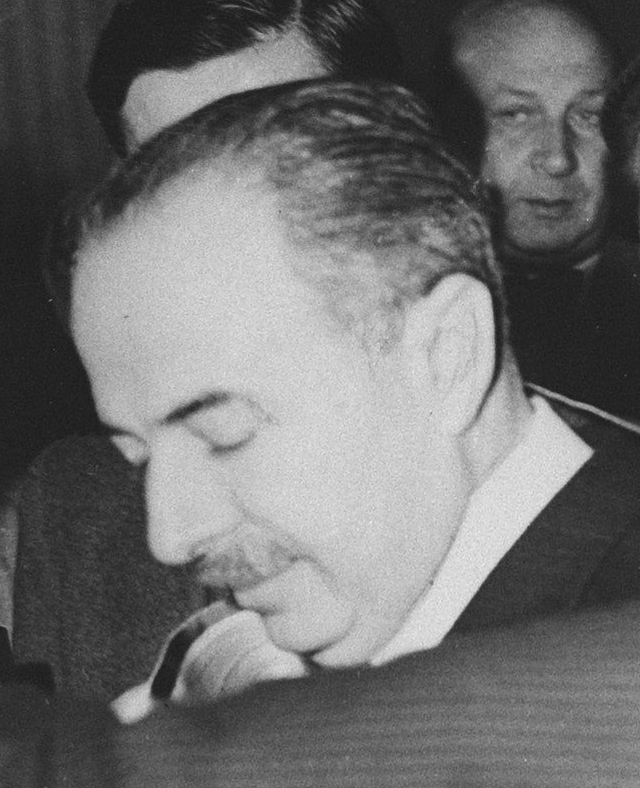
Konstantinos Kallias (1953)

Konstantinos Kallias (July 9, 1901 – April 7, 2004) was a Greek politician.

He was born in Chalkis. He studied law at the University of Athens. He co-founded with Panagiotis Kanellopoulos the National Unionist Party. He served in many ministerial positions, including Minister for Justice (1958) and vice-president of New Democracy under Konstantinos Karamanlis (1975–1976).

In the first Greek elections to the European Parliament, he was elected as a Member of the European Parliament (MEP). In 2003 he entered the Guinness Book of Records as the oldest active writer of an autobiography, at the age of 102. He died, aged 102, in Athens on April 7, 2004.
