= Jože Možina =

Slovenian historian (born 1968)

Jože Možina (born 7 April 1968) is a Slovenian right-wing historian, sociologist and journalist. Jože Možina was born in 1968 in Šempeter pri Novi Gorici, Slovenia.

== Film and TV ==
He is the author of many documentaries and broadcasts on RTV Slovenia. Most of his work involves apologia for Slovenian wartime collaboration with the occupation. He has received numerous awards for his work, including at the 2012 ITN Distribution Film and New Media Festival in Hollywood for a film about Pedro Opeka.

He is also the editor and presenter of several shows on RTV Slovenija (Intervju, Pričevalci...). Between 2006 and 2010, he was also the director of TV Slovenia.
