= Béla Mavrák =

Hungarian tenor singer (born 1966)

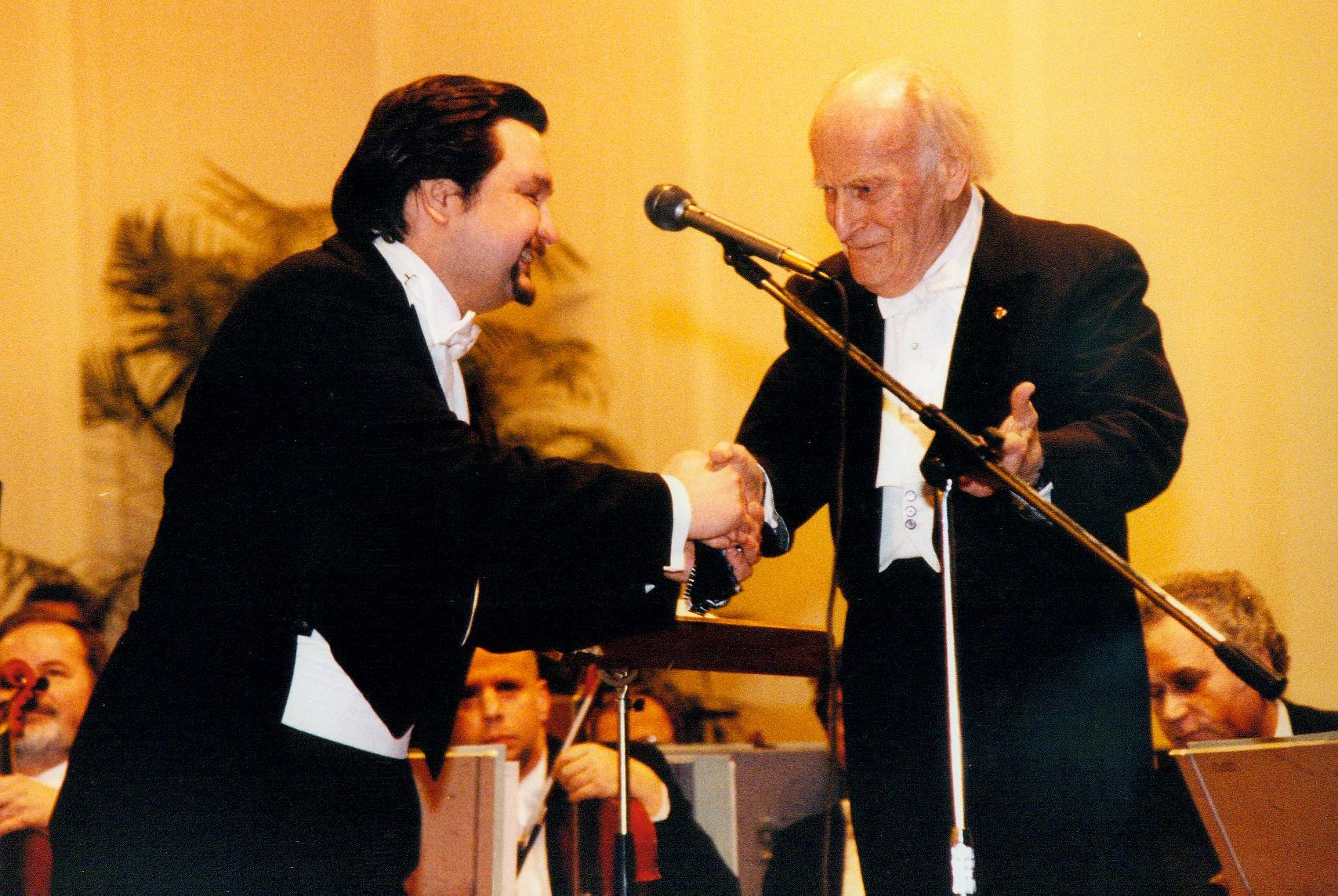
- Yehudi Menuhin and Béla Mavrák (left)

Background information
- Birth name: Béla Mavrák
- Born: 7 April 1966 (age 58); Baden bei Wien, Austria
- Genres: Opera, Latin
- Occupation: Singer (tenor)
- Years active: 1993–present
- Labels: Connector Records, Universal
- Website: www.bela-mavrak.de

Signature of Mavrák Béla round 2005

Béla Mavrák (born 7 April 1966) is a Hungarian tenor singer.

== Early life and studies ==
Béla Mavrák was born in Baden bei Wien (Austria) of Hungarian parents and grew up in the city of Zrenjanin in SAP Vojvodina, SR Serbia, SFR Yugoslavia.

From an early age he followed piano lessons in the local music school. He finished the high school medicine education and was preparing for a medical university study, but during his compulsory year in the army he got more involved with music and started trying to write his own songs. After his military duty was fulfilled he asked a friend of the family who was a music professor to help him develop his composition abilities. It was this professor Bursać who first noticed Mavrák's vocal talent and who encouraged him to enroll in the Belgrade Music Academy in 1989, where he was taught by Yugoslavian tenor Zvonimir Krnetić.

At the invitation of his uncle, a saxophonist who lived in Germany, Mavrák moved to Cologne in 1991 to continue his studies there.

Alongside his education under Wilfried Jochims at the prestigious Cologne University of Music, he received private lessons by Franco Corelli in Milano and Gianni Raimondi in Bologna. He also followed master classes with Gianni Raimondi as well as with Nicolai Gedda.

In 1994, he completed his studies and received his arts diploma. He lives in Cologne up till this day.

== Career ==
In 1993, Mavrák won the gold medal and first prize in the international singing competition in Santa Margherita Ligure (Italy) with Rodolfo's aria from Puccini's opera La bohème. He also sang in a CD production of Rossini's Petite messe solennelle. Following his success in Santa Margherita Ligure, the Belgrade State Opera hired him for his first operatic role, Rodolfo in the 1994 production of La bohème.

He sang in a CD production of Vivaldi's Magnificat as well as appearing in the Beethoven Hall (Bonn, Germany) together with the Philharmonica Hungarica in a production of Verdi's Requiem.

In the Cologne Philharmony he sang in the world premier of Marianna Martinez' In Exitu Israel and Dixit Dominus.

He reprised his role in the Requiem a year later in the Teatro Colón in Buenos Aires and the Teatro Municipal in São Paulo (Brazil).
Also in 1995, he sang the main role of Faust in Berlioz' Damnation of Faust in the Salzburg Festspielhaus (Austria).

He continued this role in a new setting when the German National Theater in Weimar contracted him for two years in 1998 as part of the Weimar European Capital of Culture festivities. Over the course of these two years he starred in ten different opera productions.

Amongst his roles were those of Faust in Gounod's Faust, Don Ottavio in Mozart's Don Giovanni, Pinkerton in Puccini's Madame Butterfly and the Italian singer in Richard Strauss' Der Rosenkavalier. In 1999, still as a part of the Cultural Capital program, he sang in the European premier of Giya Kancheli's Music for the living.

1999 also saw what Mavrák considers one of the high points of his career: he sang in a concert in aid of the Menuhin Fund, conducted by Yehudi Menuhin himself.

In 2000 Mavrák, together with Gary Bennett and Thomas Greuel, became one of the three Platin Tenors.

From 2000 till 2003 Mavrák was hired as a guest singer by several German theatres. Roles from this period are amongst others: Prince Sou Chong in Lehar's The Land of Smiles, Sandor Barinkay in Johann Strauss's Der Zigeunerbaron and Edwin in Emmerich Kálmán's Die Csárdásfürstin.

He sang in the first Berlin performance of Paul McCartney's Liverpool Oratorio, in the Konzerthaus Gendarmenmarkt in 2003.

In 2004, he sang in Mendelssohn's Lobgesang in the Berlin Philharmonic Hall.

In that year he appeared more than 20 times as Tamino in The Magic Flute by Mozart. In 2005 he sang the role of Alfredo in Verdi's La traviata in the Budapest State Opera.

Starting in 2005, Mavrák started working with André Rieu in his role as one of the Platin Tenors. Up till now they have performed more than 600 times in locations all over the world such as Semperoper in Dresden, Schönbrunn Palace in Vienna and Radio City Music Hall in New York. They also appeared in several CD and DVD productions.

In 2008, the city of Maastricht (the Netherlands) awarded Mavrák the gold honorary medal of merit, in recognition of his contributions to the city as part of André Rieu and the Strauss Orchestra.

== A new direction ==
In 2010, Mavrák recorded his solo CD in Cuba, Un soplo en el aire (a breeze in the wind). During the recording of the CD in the Abdala Studio and Radio Progreso in Havana, he worked together with the stars of Buena Vista Social Club. Amongst them are such prominent Cuban musicians as Guillermo Rubalcaba and José "Maracaibo Oriental" Castañeda. The CD was first released in Mexico in November 2010, and since then it keeps appearing in more and more countries and attracted the attention of the Universal Music Group. Mavrák has chosen for a combination of traditional Cuban songs mixed with classic Hollywood songs and more traditional songs from his childhood.
