= Irma Ravinale =

Italian composer (1937–2013)

Irma Ravinale (1 October 1937 – 7 April 2013) was an Italian composer and music educator. She taught at the Conservatory of Santa Cecilia in Rome. Ravinale has received many awards for her compositions, and was awarded the Commander of the Order of Merit of the Italian Republic, the silver medal for merit from the School of Art and Culture in Rome, and a Gold Medal for culture and the arts.

== Biography ==
Irma Ravinale was born in Naples, Italy in 1937. She studied composition at the Rome Conservatory of Santa Cecilia with Goffredo Petrassi, and continued her studies with Nadia Boulanger in Paris and Karlheinz Stockhausen in Cologne, also studying piano, conducting and choral music. After completing her education, she took a position in 1966 teaching composition at the Conservatory Santa Cecilia in Rome.

Ravinale became director of San Pietro a Maijella Conservatory in Naples where she served until 1989 and then Director of the Conservatory of Santa Cecilia where she served until 1999. She is member of the International Honour Committee of the Fondazione Donne in Musica. Her compositions have been performed by leading musicians in Italy and overseas. She is particularly known for her one-act opera Il ritratto di Dorian Gray, based on the novel by Oscar Wilde. The opera had its concert premiere by RAI in Turin in 1975. She has won many prizes for her compositions, including four national composition prizes and an international prize. She was the only woman to win the composition prize at the Conservatory of Santa Cecilia, which she was awarded in 1966.

Ravinale died in Rome, Italy, at the age of 75 on 7 April 2013.

== Honors and awards ==
- Commander of the Order of Merit of the Italian Republic, Rome, 2 June 1992
- Silver medal for meritorious school of art and culture, Rome, 2 June 1994
- Gold Medal for Culture and the Arts

== Works ==
Ravinale composes works for symphony orchestra, chamber ensembles and musical theatre. Selected works include:

- 1965 Scorpion, for chorus a cappella, from Trilussa
- 1966 Death meditated, cantata for baritone and string quartet
- 1967 Concerto for oboe, horn, timpani and strings
- 1967 Ballad of love and war, for soprano, violin, cello and piano
- 1968 Concerto for Strings
- 1970 Night Trio for violin, viola d'amore and cello
- 1970 The Picture of Dorian Gray, play by Oscar Wilde
- 1971 Invention concerted, for 13 wind instruments
- 1972 Sinfonia Concertante for guitar and orchestra
- 1974 Serenade for guitar, flute and viola
- 1976 Sequentia, for guitar and string quartet
- 1976 Spleen, for baritone and orchestra (Won an award at the International Competition of Trieste)
- 1977 Dialogues, for viola, guitar and orchestra
- 1978 Changeling, for harpsichord and small orchestra
- 1979 Improvisation for guitar alone
- 1980 Jontly for two guitars
- 1980 Recherche, for violin only
- 1981 But ... what comes after love, for oboe and horn
- 1981 Improvisation II, for harpsichord
- 1982 Sombras, for guitar alone
- 1983 Les Adieux, for violin and orchestra
- 1984 Per una mano sola, for piano
- 1984 To Ada, for clarinet
- 1985 Ode to a star, for organ and concertante string orchestra
- 1987 Duo for violin and guitar
- 1987 Untitled, for clarinet and bass clarinet in E flat
- 1988 Elegy of silence, for chamber orchestra
- 1989 The Ballad of the vassal, for female voice
- 1989 Jeux, for guitar
- 1990 Two arias for baritone voice
- 1990 Poem for Oscar Romero, for baritone, mixed choir and orchestra
- 1991 Quintet for oboe, clarinet, bassoon, horn and piano
- 1992 Nuit, for cello only
- 1995 Prologue, for narrator and five instruments, from Pier Paolo Pasolini
- 1996 Sextet for Strings
- 1997 Pour une etoile, for body only
- 1999 The Remains of the day, for orchestra
- 2004 In memory of those we love, for mezzo-soprano, piccolo and orchestra
- 2004 Ode to friendship, for violin and cello
- 2005 Second Quintet for two trumpets, trombone, tubacorno and tuba
- 2005 Puer natus est, for nine male voices
- 2006 Cadenza, for solo violin
- 2009 Vaghezie, for cello and soprano
- 2012 Pour un cher amie, for clarinet and piano
