= Swithun Wells =

English Roman Catholic saint

Saint Swithin Wells
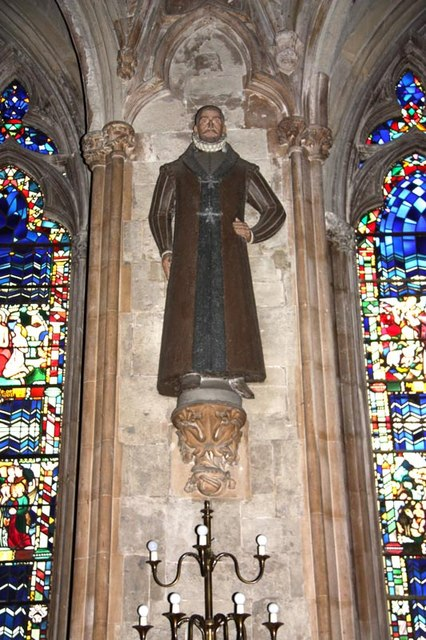
- Statue of Swithin Wells in the St Etheldreda's Church, Ely Place, London

Martyr
- Born: c. 1536; Brambridge House, Otterbourne, Hampshire
- Died: 10 December 1591 (aged 54–55); Gray's Inn Lane, London
- Venerated in: Roman Catholic Church
- Beatified: 15 December 1929 by Pope Pius XI
- Canonized: 25 October 1970 by Pope Paul VI
- Feast: 10 December (individual); 25 October (collectively with Forty Martyrs of England and Wales)
- Attributes: reading a book or holding a stack of books, falcon

Swithin Wells (c. 1536 – 10 December 1591) was an English Roman Catholic martyr who was executed during the reign of Elizabeth I. Wells was a country gentleman and one time schoolmaster whose family sheltered hunted priests. He himself often arranged passage from one safehouse to another. His home in Gray's Inn Lane (where he was hanged) was known to welcome recusants.

== Life ==
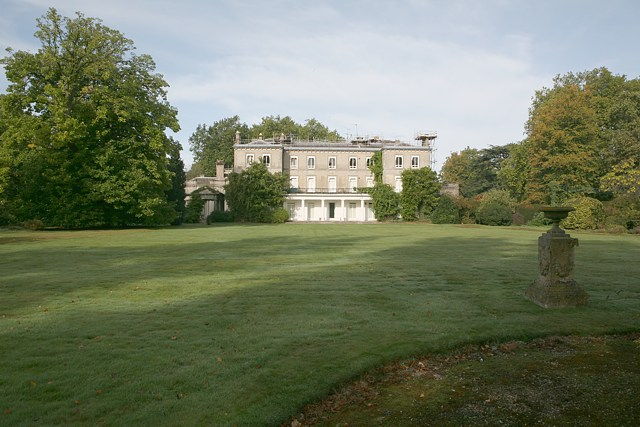
Brambridge House, Hampshire, birthplace of Swithin Wells

Wells was born at Brambridge House, Hampshire in 1536, of a wealthy country family, and was christened with the name of the local saint and bishop Swithun. He was the youngest of the five or six sons of Thomas Wells of Brambridge, by Mary, daughter of John Mompesson. During the Reformation, his family contributed to the secret funerals of Catholics at the local cemetery, and their house was a place of refuge for priests. Wells was well-educated, a poet, musician, and sportsman.

At one time he was tutor to the household of the Earl of Southampton, and was for many years a schoolmaster at Monkton Farleigh in Wiltshire. In 1582 he came under suspicion for his popish sympathies and on 25 May 1582, the Privy Council ordered a search to be made for him. It was at that time that he gave up the school. During this period, he attended Protestant services, but in 1583, was reconciled to the Catholic Church. He actively supported priests, organizing their often dangerous journeys from one safehouse to another. In 1585 he went to London, where he purchased a house in Gray's Inn Lane. Their home was a centre of hospitality for recusants.

=== Arrests ===
In June 1586, he was arrested with seminarians Alexander Rawlins and Christopher Dryland and imprisoned in Newgate Prison, but was released 4 July when his nephew posted bail. On 9 August 1586, he was examined for supposed complicity in the Babington Plot, and on 30 November 1586, he was discharged from the Fleet prison. At one point he went to Rome on a mission for the Earl of Southampton, but he returned to England to work in the English Catholic underground. He was again examined 5 March 1587, and on this occasion speaks of the well known recusant, George Cotton of Warblington, Hampshire, as his cousin.

In 1591, Edmund Gennings was saying Mass at Wells's house, when the priest-hunter Richard Topcliffe burst in with his officers. The congregation, not wishing the Mass to be interrupted, held the door and beat back the officers until the service was finished, after which they all surrendered peacefully. Wells was not present at the time, but his wife was; she and Gennings were arrested along with another priest by the name of Polydore Plasden, and three laymen named John Mason, Sidney Hodgson, and Brian Lacey. Wells was immediately arrested and imprisoned on his return. He was charged under the 1585 (27 Eliz. 1. c. 2) Act Against Jesuits, Seminary Priests and Other Such Disobedient Subjects. At his trial, he said that he had not been present at the Mass, but wished he had been.

=== Death ===
Wells was sentenced to die by hanging, and a gibbet was erected outside his own house on 10 December 1591 On his way to the scaffold Wells caught sight of an old friend in the crowd and said to him, "Goodbye my dear. Goodbye to our nice hunting companies. Now I have something much more important to do." After he had climbed the ladder, Topcliffe called for a minister, who attempted to persuade Wells to confess to following false doctrine and traitorous priests. Wells turned and responded, "although I heard you say somewhat, yet it is but one doctor's opinion, and he also a very young one." The young minister was so daunted that he had no reply. Topcliffe then baited Wells, saying that "Dog-bolt Papists! you follow the Pope and his Bulls; believe me, I think some bulls begot you". Wells responded in kind: "if we have bulls to our fathers, thou hast a cow to thy mother". He then immediately begged pardon and asked Topcliffe not to provoke him when he was trying to focus on other matters. Wells was buried in St Andrew's Churchyard in Holborn.

His wife, Alice, was reprieved, but died in prison in 1602. Swithin's eldest brother Gilbert, suffered much both personally and economically for his faith. He died as a known recusant after losing the property, but it was later restored to the family by King Charles II.

== Veneration ==
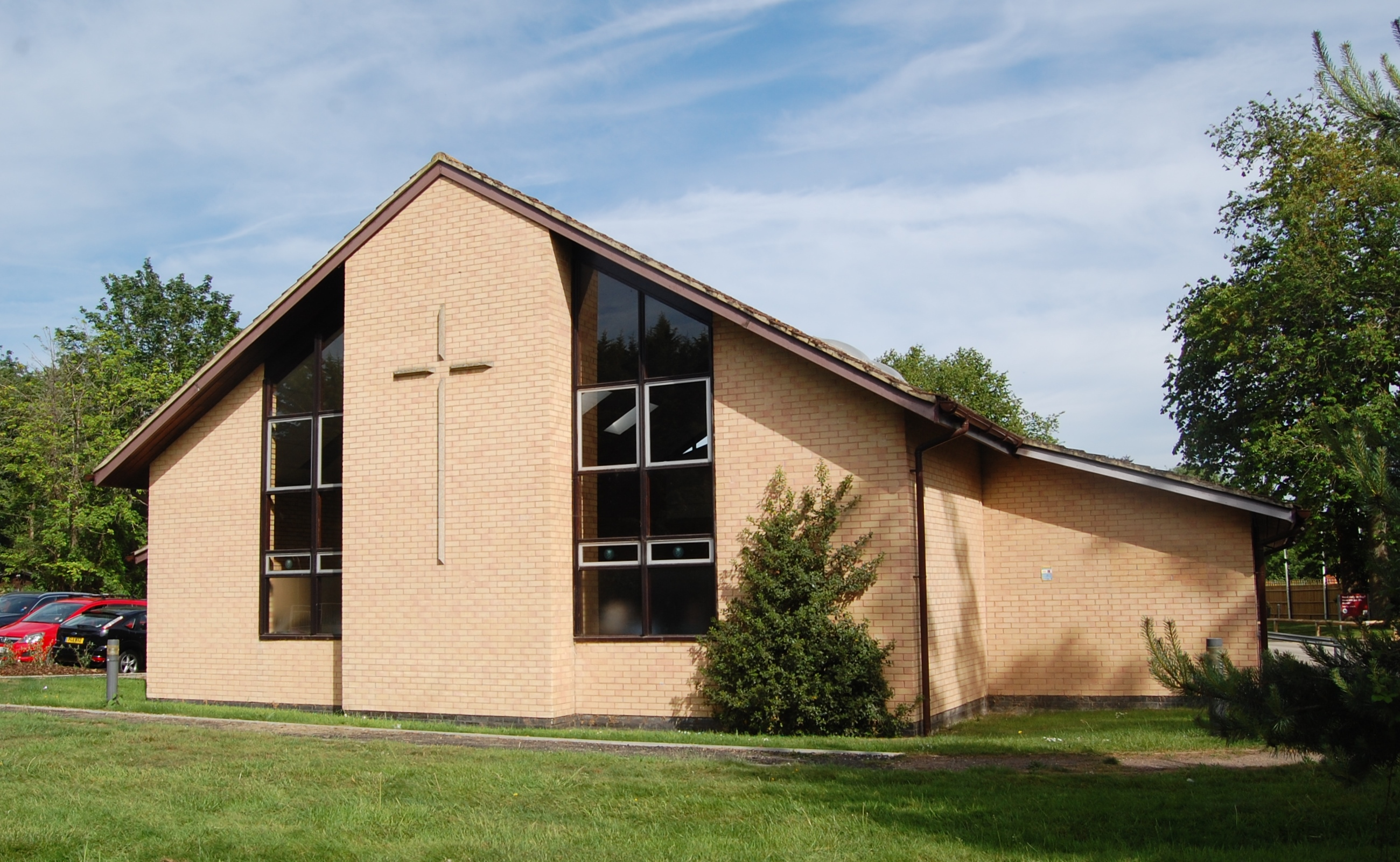
St Swithun Wells Church in Fair Oak, Hampshire

Swithin Wells was beatified by Pope Pius XI on 15 December 1929, and canonized by Pope Paul VI on 25 October 1970, as one of the Forty Martyrs of England and Wales. His feast day, along with that of the other thirty-nine martyrs, was 25 October, but since the new calendar for England and Wales was approved by the Vatican in 2000, the Saints and Blessed Martyrs from the Reformation Period have been celebrated on 4 May as "The English Martyrs".

St Swithun Wells Catholic Primary School is located in Chandler's Ford, near Eastleigh, Hampshire. St Swithun Wells Church opened in nearby Fair Oak in 1978, and gives its name to the wider Catholic Parish of St Swithun Wells. However, in March 2026, due to a dwindling congregation and a lack of activities, the church dedicated to St Swithun Wells was closed. In any case, the Parish remains dedicated to him and comprises five churches in South and West Hampshire

== Bibliography ==
- McAuley, James (16 July 2016). The Diocese of Portsmouth Parish Boundaries 2016 (PDF) (Report). Portsmouth: Roman Catholic Diocese of Portsmouth. Archived (PDF) from the original on 16 May 2017.
