= Henry Walpole =

English Jesuit martyr, executed in 1595

Saint Henry Walpole SJ
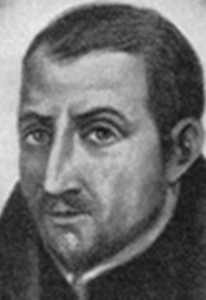
- Born: 1558; Docking, Norfolk, England
- Died: 7 April 1595 (aged 36–37); York, England
- Venerated in: Roman Catholic Church
- Beatified: 15 December 1929 by Pope Pius XI
- Canonized: 25 October 1970 by Pope Paul VI
- Feast: 7 April

Henry Walpole, SJ (1558 – 7 April 1595) was an English Jesuit martyr, executed at York for refusing to take the Oath of Supremacy.

== Early life ==
Walpole was born at Docking, Norfolk, in 1558, the eldest son of Christopher Walpole, by Margery, heiress of Richard Beckham of Narford. Michael Walpole was the youngest of his four brothers. He was educated at Norwich School, Peterhouse, Cambridge, and Gray's Inn. While at Gray's Inn, he came to the attention of government spies by his frequent association with known recusant gentry.

He attended the public disputations that Edmund Campion held with Anglican divines, and was present at the execution of Campion in 1581: his clothes were sprinkled with Campion's blood. Heretofore somewhat lukewarm in religious matters, Walpole then gave up his law practice and followed in Campion's footsteps. He wrote a small book of poetry honouring Campion which was secretly printed and circulated in London. The authorities sought to discover the parties involved. The printer, a friend of Walpole named Valenger, was fined and suffered cropping of his ears, but did not betray Walpole, who was nonetheless under suspicion. Walpole fled London for his father's home in Norfolk, and from there escaped to France.

== Jesuit ==
He went by way of Rouen and Paris, to Reims, where he arrived on 7 July 1582. On 28 April 1583, he was admitted into the English College, Rome, and in October he received minor orders. On 2 February 1584, he became a probationer of the Jesuits, and soon afterwards he returned to France, where he continued his studies, chiefly at the Scots College at Pont-à-Mousson. He was ordained subdeacon and deacon at Metz, and priest at Paris on 17 December 1588. He was then sent to Brussels. Walpole was fluent in Italian, French, Latin, English, and Spanish.

After staying in Brussels for a year, he was assigned military chaplain to the English and Irish Catholic refugees serving in the Spanish forces in the Netherlands. He was captured and taken to the English fort at Flushing, where he was tortured before being ransomed by his brother Michael and his Jesuit superiors. He then went to Tournai for his third year of probation, after which he was sent to help with the founding of the new English seminaries at Seville and Valladolid. In 1593 he travelled to Philip II of Spain to obtain permission to found St Omer, now Stonyhurst College in Lancashire.

Walpole, his youngest brother Thomas, and an English soldier sailed from Dunkirk on a French semi-pirate ship headed for Scotland because the southern ports of England were closed because of the plague. After ten days of stormy seas, they were put ashore at Flamborough Head, Yorkshire, on 4 December 1593, and immediately split up. Walpole was arrested at an inn in Bridlington, having been betrayed by a fellow passenger who was earning money to buy his way out of prison. Walpole was imprisoned for the next sixteen months.

Walpole spent about three months at York Castle before priest hunter Richard Topcliffe had him transferred to the Tower of London in February 1594. There Walpole was tortured on the rack and suspended by his wrists for hours, fourteen sessions spaced out so as not to cause his accidental death under interrogation. His father was in failing health, and, as Henry was his heir, the estate would escheat to the crown if Henry were condemned for treason.

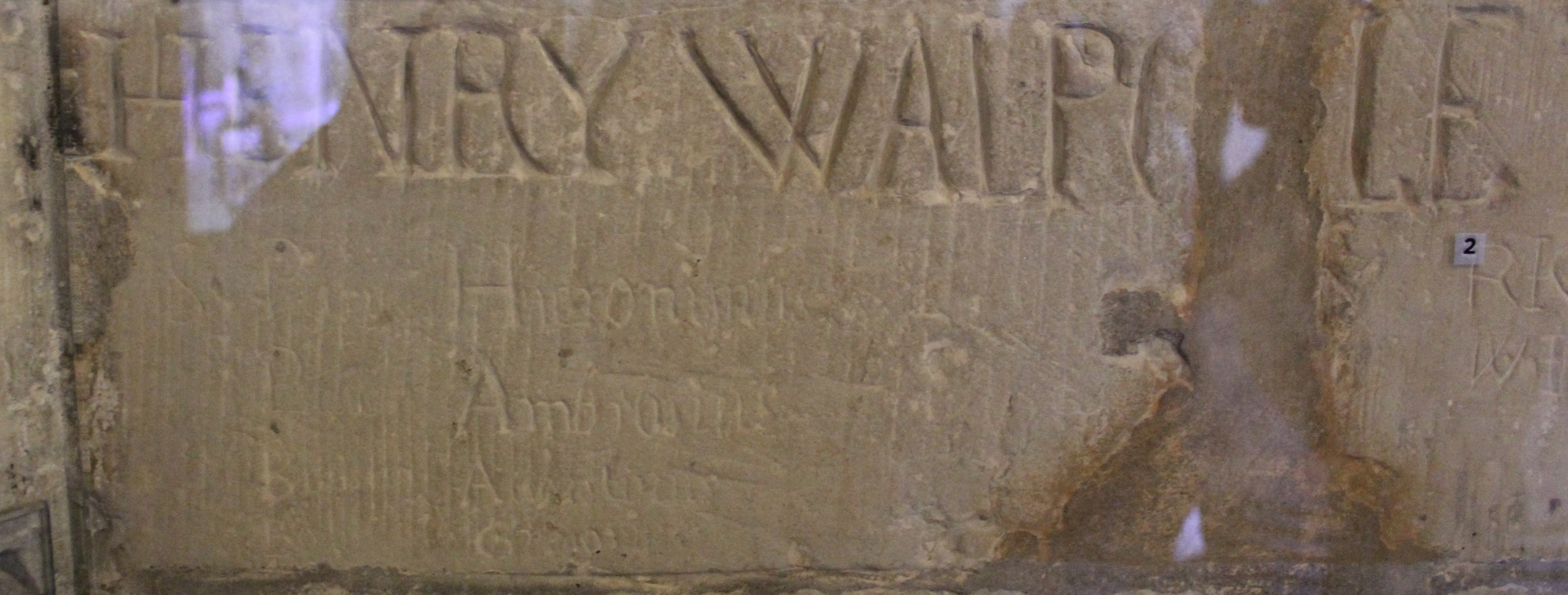
While incarcerated in the Salt Tower, Walpole carved his name in the plaster along with those of saints Peter, Paul, Jerome, Ambrose, Augustine and Gregory the Great.

In the spring of 1595, he was sent back to York for trial, where he was joined by Alexander Rawlins, who was also awaiting trial. Both were tried on 3 April on the charge of being Catholic priests. Walpole, a former lawyer, argued that the law only applied to priests who had not given themselves up to officials within three days of arrival. He himself had been arrested less than a day after landing in England, so he had not violated that law. The judges demanded that he take the Oath of Supremacy, acknowledging the queen's complete authority in religion. He refused to do so and was convicted of high treason. Both he and Rawlins were found guilty and condemned, and on 7 April 1595, they were hanged, drawn and quartered. Rawlins died first; Walpole was allowed to hang until he was dead.

== Commemoration ==
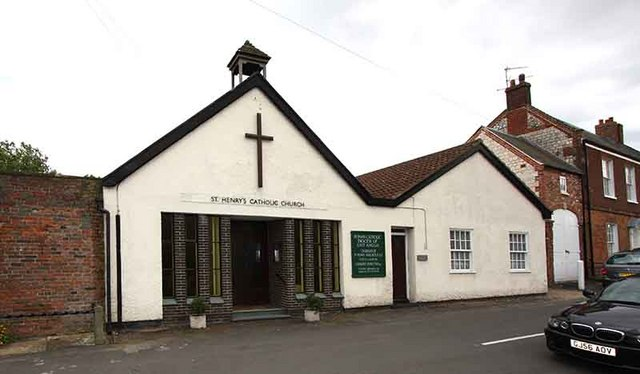
St Henry's Catholic Church, Burnham Market, Norfolk

A Spanish account of Walpole's life and martyrdom was brought out by Joseph Creswell as Historia de la Vida y Martyrio que padecio en Inglaterra, este año de .1595. el P. Henrique Valpolo sacerdote de la Compañia de Iesus, que fue embiado del Colegio de los Ingleses de Valladolid, y ha sido el primer martyr de los Seminarios de España. Con el martyrio de otros quatro Sacerdotes: los dos de la misma Compañia, y los otros dos de los Seminarios (En Madrid, en casa de Pedro Madrigal, 1596).

Augustus Jessopp wrote a biography of Walpole under the title One generation of a Norfolk house, and edited his letters, which were printed at Norwich in 1873 under the title Letters of Fa. Henry Walpole, S.J..

Walpole was beatified in 1929 and canonized in 1970 as one of the Forty Martyrs of England and Wales. His feast day is celebrated on 7 April. St Henry Walpole Catholic Church, Burnham Market, Norfolk, is named in his honour.

== See also ==
- Walpole family
- Anmer Hall
- Jesuits, etc. Act 1584
