= Edmund Gennings =

English Roman Catholic saint

Saint Edmund Gennings
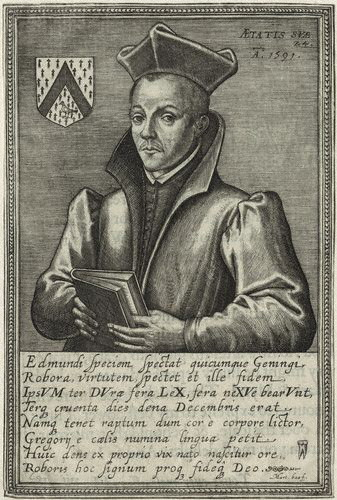

Priest and Martyr
- Born: c. 1567; Lichfield, England
- Died: 10 December 1591 (aged 23 - 24); Gray's Inn, London, England
- Venerated in: Roman Catholic Church
- Beatified: 15 December 1929 by Pope Pius XI
- Canonized: 25 October 1970 by Pope Paul VI
- Feast: 10 December, 25 October
- Attributes: priest's biretta, book of hours

Edmund Gennings (1567 – 10 December 1591), was an English martyr, who was executed during the English Reformation for being a Roman Catholic priest. He came from Lichfield, Staffordshire.

== Life ==
Gennings was born at Lichfield in 1567. A thoughtful, serious boy naturally inclined to matters of faith, at the age of sixteen he became a page to a Catholic gentleman, Richard Sherwood. Impressed by his master's example, when Sherwood left England to become a priest, Gennings followed. He went immediately to the English College at Rheims where he was ordained a priest at Soissons in 1590, being then only twenty-three years of age. He immediately returned to the dangers of England under the assumed name of "Ironmonger".

== Mission ==
On his return to England, Gennings landed at Whitby. He was estranged from his family because of his conversion, but headed straight for Lichfield to seek out his kindred. He found that all his relatives were dead except one brother, who had left his native city and gone to London. There Gennings proceeded and for a whole month searched the city, visiting every place where he thought his brother might be found. Eventually, when he was about to give up the search, he achieved his purpose, but the younger brother, far from being won over to Gennings's faith, only besought him to go away, lest he himself should become suspect. Gennings then returned to France.

== Arrest and Execution ==
Gennings returned to London in 1591. His missionary career was brief. He and Polydore Plasden were seized by Richard Topcliffe and his officers whilst in the act of saying Mass in the house of Saint Swithun Wells at Gray's Inn in London on 7 November 1591 and he was hanged, drawn and quartered outside the same house on 10 December. His execution was particularly bloody, as his final speech angered Topcliffe, who ordered the rope to be cut down when he was barely stunned from the hanging. It is reported that he uttered the words, Sancte Gregori ora pro me (Saint Gregory, pray for me) while he was being disembowelled, and that the hangman swore, Zounds! See, his heart is in my hand, and yet Gregory is in his mouth. O egregious Papist. Swithun Wells was hanged immediately afterwards. The martyrdom of Edmund Gennings was the occasion of several extraordinary incidents, chief of which was the conversion of his younger brother John, who later wrote his biography, published in 1614 at Saint-Omer.

== Veneration ==
Edmund Gennings was canonized as one of the Forty Martyrs of England and Wales by Pope Paul VI on 25 October 1970. Their feast day is on 25 October.

A Catholic Mass centre opened in 1967 in the New Invention area of Willenhall, West Midlands, was later rebuilt to a church and dedicated to Edmund Gennings.

== Sources ==
- Richard Challoner: Memoirs of Missionary Priests
- Encyclopædia Britannica, 15th Edition
