= Richard Topcliffe =

English politician, priest-hunter and torturer (1531–1604)

Richard Topcliffe (14 November 1531 – late 1604) was a priest hunter and practitioner of torture during the reign of Queen Elizabeth I of England and Ireland. A landowner and Member of Parliament, he became notorious as the government's chief enforcer of the penal laws against the practice of Catholicism.

== Early life ==
Topcliffe was the eldest son of Robert Topcliffe of Somerby, Lincolnshire, and his wife, Margaret, daughter of Thomas Burgh, 1st Baron Burgh of Gainsborough, who had been chamberlain of the household to queen Anne Boleyn. His uncle Edward Burgh was queen Katherine Parr's first husband — so Topcliffe was extremely well-connected. When his father died in 1544, the twelve-year-old Topcliffe became the ward of his uncle, Sir Anthony Neville. In 1548, aged sixteen, like other well-to-do young Elizabethan gentlemen he entered Gray's Inn, though he never practised law. On coming of age in 1553, he entered upon a large property, over 4,000 acres.

== Career ==
According to his own account, he entered the service of the Queen in 1557, a year before her accession to the throne, when they were both in their mid-twenties, but he did not begin his service of the state until the Northern Rebellion of 1569 when he armed a troop of thirty horses at his own expense. In his early years, too, he had served the 6th Earl of Shrewsbury, but then became one of Leicester's men. There is no foundation for the frequently-repeated assertion that he worked for Burghley and Walsingham. As an independent, self-financed operator with his own squadron of "instruments" as he called them, he worked with both Burghley and Walsingham under commission from the Privy Council, and was on very good terms with them both, though he always considered himself the Queen's personal servant and friend.

He represented Beverley in Parliament in 1572. He would later return to Parliament as MP for Old Sarum in 1584 and 1586.

Topcliffe was a tireless agent of the English government's determination to eradicate Catholicism from England. At the height of his power, from the late 1580s until 1595, he hunted, captured, arrested, and interrogated many prisoners - often with torture. Topcliffe's infamous interrogations took place either in the Tower of London, in Bridewell prison, or even at his own house in Westminster, next to the Gatehouse prison. Exiled Catholic intelligencer Richard Verstegan regularly reported on Topcliffe's activities, condemning him "whose inhuman cruelty is so great, as he will not spare to extend any torture whatsoever". His favourite method (which he may have introduced) was to hang a prisoner by the hands in the gauntlets or manacles, a procedure which, though exquisitely painful, left no permanent injury if properly administered. Improperly administered, it caused permanent internal injury and even death. There is some evidence that he used psychological torture as well, keeping prisoners awake, for instance.

Having seen his prisoners through to trial and condemnation, he would then attend the executions as a kind of master of the ceremonies, usually putting up a notice or titulus on the gallows indicating the sufferer's name and offence, and making sure that the full rigours of the sentence — hanging, drawing, and quartering while still alive for those convicted of treason — were carried out. Under the law after 1585, merely being a priest in England was treason. The British literary critic Frank Kermode notes in The Age of Shakespeare that "Topcliffe's copy of a history of the Jesuit mission survives, with his gloating marginalia: beside the name of a missionary the words ‘I racked him.’; and beside the name of someone hanged, a little stick figure dangling from a gallows.” Unfortunately, Kermode's reference cannot be verified, though Topcliffe, whose official police career began with the searching out of Catholic books, was fond of annotating the books he confiscated and kept.

Topcliffe's victims included the Jesuits Robert Southwell, and Henry Walpole. Topcliffe features numerous times in John Gerard, S.J.'s autobiography of his days as a hunted priest in Elizabethan England. In it, he is described as "old and hoary and a veteran in evil". In early 1592, he or one of his men, Nicholas Jones, raped or seduced a prisoner in the Gatehouse prison, Anne Bellamy, and persuaded her to arrange the capture of the Jesuit priest Robert Southwell at her family's house outside London. When Bellamy married Jones, Topcliffe tried to force her father to give the couple an estate. What became of them is unknown, but the Bellamy family was ruined. Anne Bellamy was the Queen's prisoner, and therefore entitled to her protection, yet no action was taken against Topcliffe over this affair, even though the Queen knew about the pregnancy, and knew that Topcliffe had spirited the woman away to his house in Lincolnshire.

In August 1597, the Council commissioned Topcliffe to investigate the play by Ben Jonson and Thomas Nashe, The Isle of Dogs, which so badly upset the authorities. Fortunately for Jonson, by then Topcliffe's general commission had been withdrawn, and his power much curtailed, though he never lost favour with the Queen and the Cecils. It is possible, though unlikely, that he initiated the inquiry.

== The Fitzherberts ==
Topcliffe, who was engaged in a long-running attempt to destroy the Catholic Fitzherberts of Derbyshire and Staffordshire, persuaded Sir Thomas Fitzherbert's heir, also Thomas, to assist him. He entered into a bond under which Thomas Fitzherbert would pay him £3,000 for bringing about the deaths of his uncle Sir Thomas, his father John, and a cousin, William Bassett. The uncle and the father died in prison, and the cousin remained alive. When Fitzherbert refused to pay up, Topcliffe sued him in Chancery for the money. Scandalised, the Privy Council intervened. Topcliffe insulted them, and they put him in prison. The Queen released him after a couple of weeks in response to his personal letters to her. He did not get the money, but he had succeeded in tricking Thomas into deeding an estate in Padley, Derbyshire, to him. Under King James I, though, the 7th Earl of Shrewsbury ejected him, and the Fitzherberts recovered the property.

== Death ==
Topcliffe died in November or December 1604 at the age of about 73. His heir, Charles, succeeded to a heavily encumbered estate. Like Walsingham, Topcliffe impoverished himself by his service to the crown.

== Depictions ==
Richard Topcliffe was portrayed by Brian Wilde in the 1971 British television mini-series Elizabeth R. Topcliffe is featured in Rory Clements' "John Shakespeare" murder mystery novel series as a sadistic torturer. Topcliffe is also portrayed as a torturer and persecutor of Catholics in the Sir Robert Carey and James Enys novels by P.F. Chisholm/Patricia Finney.

Topcliffe is portrayed by Ewen Bremner in the 2017 American television series Will, a fictional look at the life of young William Shakespeare. In the series, Shakespeare bases the scheming title character of Richard III on Topcliffe.

Topcliffe is the master villain in the latter half of Robert Hugh Benson's 1912 novel, Come Rack! Come Rope!, in which the Topcliffe character pursues and ultimately executes several priests, including Edmund Campion and the protagonist of the novel, Robin Audrey.

In Modern literature in Irish, Topcliffe is fictionalised as the malevolent priest hunter Elias Creepe in Liam Mac Cóil's 2014 prizewinning novel I dTír Strainséartha (In a Strange Land).

== Quotation ==
The morrow after Simon and Jude's day I was hanged at the wall from the ground, my manacles fast locked into a staple as high as I could reach upon a stool: the stool taken away where I hanged from a little after 8 o'clock in the morning till after 4 in the afternoon, without any ease or comfort at all, saving that Topcliffe came in and told me that the Spaniards were come into Southwark by our means: "For lo, do you not hear the drums" (for then the drums played in honour of the Lord Mayor). The next day after also I was hanged up an hour or two: such is the malicious minds of our adversaries.

—Saint Eustace White, S.J., written to Father Henry Garnet from prison. 23 November 1591. Quoted in The Other Face; Catholic Life Under Elizabeth I, by Father Philip Caraman, pages 235–236.

The Chief Justice asked how old he was, seeming to scorn his youth. He answered that he was near about the age of our Saviour, Who lived upon the earth thirty-three years; and he himself was as he thought near about thirty-four years. Hereat Topcliffe seemed to make great acclamation, saying that he compared himself to Christ. Mr. Southwell answered, "No he was a humble worm created by Christ." "Yes", said Topcliffe, "you are Christ's fellow."

—Father Henry Garnet, "Account of the Trial of Robert Southwell." Quoted in Caraman's The Other Face, page 230.
