= Broome =

Broome may refer to:

== Places ==
=== Australia ===
- Broome, Western Australia
  - Broome International Airport
  - Broome Tramway
  - Roman Catholic Diocese of Broome
  - Shire of Broome
  - Attack on Broome during World War II

=== United Kingdom ===
- Broome Park, Kent
- Broome, Norfolk
- Broome, Shropshire
- Broome, Worcestershire

=== United States ===
- Broome, New York
- Broome County, New York
- Broome, Texas
- Broome Street, New York City

== Ships ==
- HMAS Broome (ACPB 90), an Armidale class patrol boat
- HMAS Broome (J191), a Bathurst class corvette
- USS Broome (DD-210), a Clemson class destroyer

== Other uses ==
- Broome (name)
- Broome Sandstone, a Mesozoic geologic formation
- Broome (horse), thoroughbred racehorse

== See also ==
- Brome (disambiguation)
- Broom (disambiguation)
