= Brome =

Brome may refer to:

== People ==
- Brome (surname)

== Places ==
- Brome, Suffolk, England
  - Brome and Oakley, a civil parish in Suffolk
- Brome (Samtgemeinde), an administrative district in Gifhorn, Lower Saxony, Germany
  - Brome, Germany, a municipality, seat of the Samtgemeinde

=== Canada ===
- Brome, Quebec, a village
- Brome County, Quebec, a historical county, abolished in the early 1980s
- Brome (federal electoral district), a federal electoral district in Quebec from 1867 to 1925
- Brome (provincial electoral district), a district in the Estrie region of Quebec from 1867 to 1972
- Mont Brome, part of the Monteregian Hills in southern Quebec
- Brome Lake, a lake in the county of Quebec
- Brome Lake, Quebec, a town with the lake within it

== Other uses ==
- Several species of grass, see Bromus
- Brome, a character from the Redwall series by Brian Jacques

== See also ==
- The Brome play of Abraham and Isaac, a 15th-century Middle English play
- Broom (disambiguation)
- Broome (disambiguation)
