= Tram Hollow =

Tram Hollow may refer to:

- Tram Hollow (Oregon County, Missouri)
- Tram Hollow (Ripley County, Missouri)
