= Broom (disambiguation) =

A broom is a cleaning tool which also had other uses (e.g. magical and punitive).

Broom may also refer to:

== People ==
- Broom (surname)

== Places ==
- Broom, Bedfordshire, England
- Broom, Cumbria, England
- Park Broom, Cumbria, England
- Broom, a neighbourhood of Newton Mearns, East Renfrewshire, Scotland
- Broom, South Yorkshire, England
- Broom, Warwickshire, England
- Broom, Worcestershire, England
- Broom, Pembrokeshire, Wales, in Kilgetty/Begelly community
- Loch Broom, Scotland

== Other uses ==
- Broom (plant), a group of shrubs
- Broom: An International Magazine of the Arts, a modernist literary magazine
- Equipment used in broomball
- Equipment used in curling (also called a brush)
- Broom (album), an album by the American band Someone Still Loves You Boris Yeltsin

== See also ==
- Brome (disambiguation)
- Broome (disambiguation)
