= Broome, Texas =

Broome
- Unincorporated community
- Location within the state of Texas Broome (the United States)
- Coordinates: 31°45′35″N 100°50′14″W
- Country: United States
- State: Texas
- County: Sterling
- Elevation: 2,211 ft (674 m)
- Time zone: UTC-6 (Central (CST))
  - Summer (DST): UTC-5 (CDT)
- GNIS feature ID: 1378052

Broome is an unincorporated community in Sterling County, Texas, United States. Its elevation is 2,211 feet (674 m). It lies southeast of Sterling City, the county seat of Sterling County.

== Education ==
All parts of the county are in the Sterling City Independent School District. Sterling City High School is the district's comprehensive high school.

All of Sterling County is in the service area of Howard County Junior College District.
