= National Register of Historic Places listings in Sterling County, Texas =

Location of Sterling County in Texas

This is a list of the National Register of Historic Places listings in Sterling County, Texas.

This is intended to be a complete list of properties listed on the National Register of Historic Places in Sterling County, Texas. There is one property listed on the National Register in the county.

This National Park Service list is complete through NPS recent listings posted February 20, 2026.

== Current listings ==
The publicly disclosed locations of National Register properties may be seen in a mapping service provided.

	Name on the Register	Image	Date listed	Location	City or town	Description
1	Sterling City Gulf, Colorado & Santa Fe Railway Passenger Depot	Sterling City Gulf, Colorado & Santa Fe Railway Passenger Depot	October 21, 2020 (#100005690)	415 Stadium Ave. 31°50′32″N 100°59′04″W	Sterling City	

== See also ==
- National Register of Historic Places listings in Texas
- Recorded Texas Historic Landmarks in Sterling County
