= Brome (surname) =

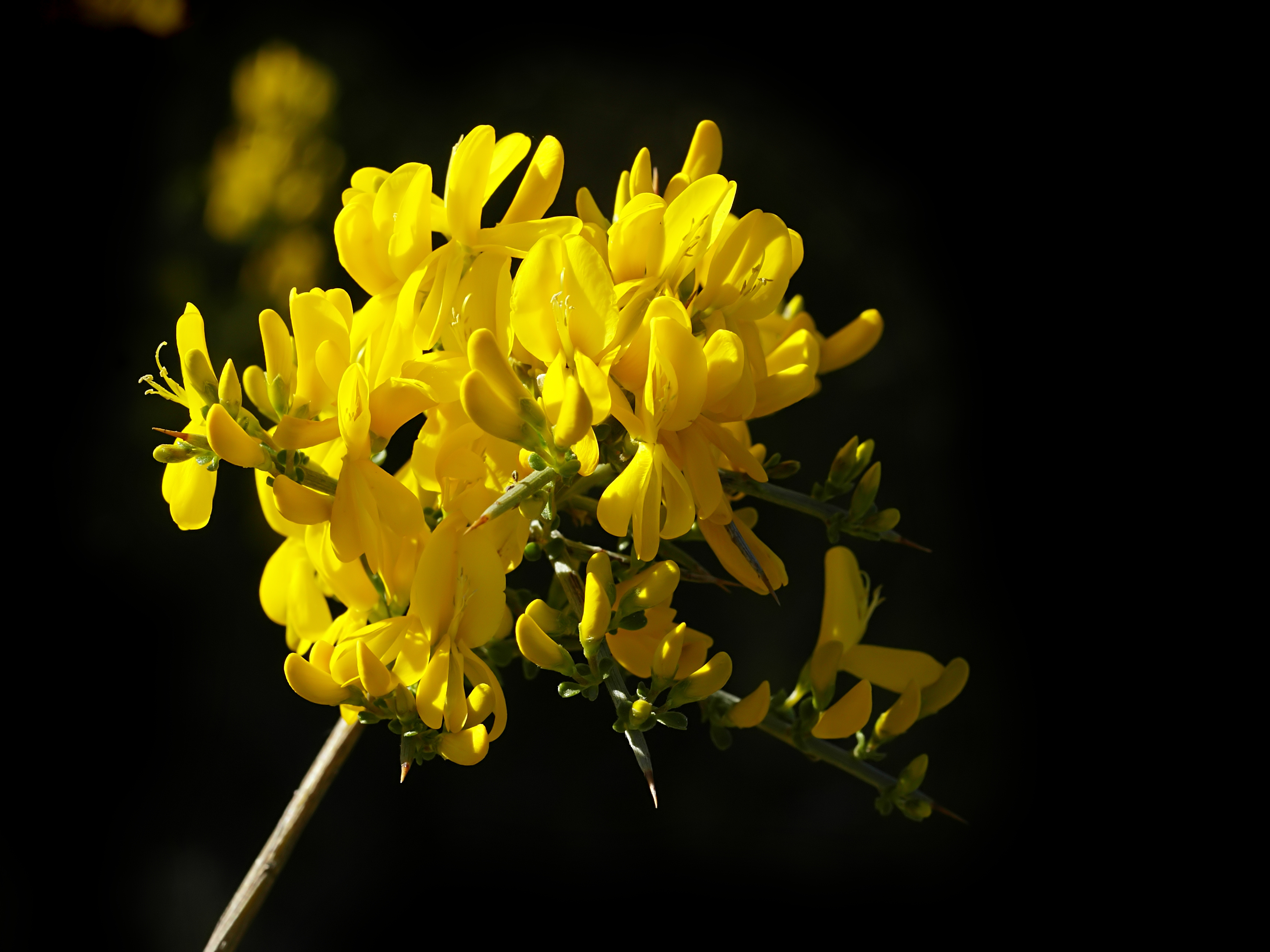
- Broom plant, Hans Hillewaert, 2008

Origin
- Languages: Frankish, French, English
- Meaning: Village in Suffolk, England

Other names
- Variant form: Broome

Brome is a surname of French and English origin. The Earls of Anjou were the first to take the name Brome. Fulke, Earl of Anjou chose to represent the Brome family name with a broom plant (Calicotome spinosa). Notable people with the surname include:

- Alexander Brome (1620–1666), English poet
- Bartholomew Brome (fl. 1589), English politician
- Richard Brome (c.1590–1653), English dramatist
- Vincent Brome (1910–2004), English writer
- James Brome (died 1719), English clergyman
- Joseph Brome (died 1825), British army officer
- Joseph Brome (died 1796), British army officer
- Simon Brome (died 1600), English politician
- Thomas Brome (died 1380), English Carmelite friar
- Rufus Brome (born 1935), 12th bishop of Barbados

== See also ==
- Adam de Brome (died 1332), English almoner and college founder
- Lotta Bromé (born 1964), Swedish radio and television host
- Mathias Bromé (born 1994), Swedish hockey player
- Brome and Oakley, English civil parish
