= Tropical Storm Imelda (2019) =

Atlantic tropical storm in 2019

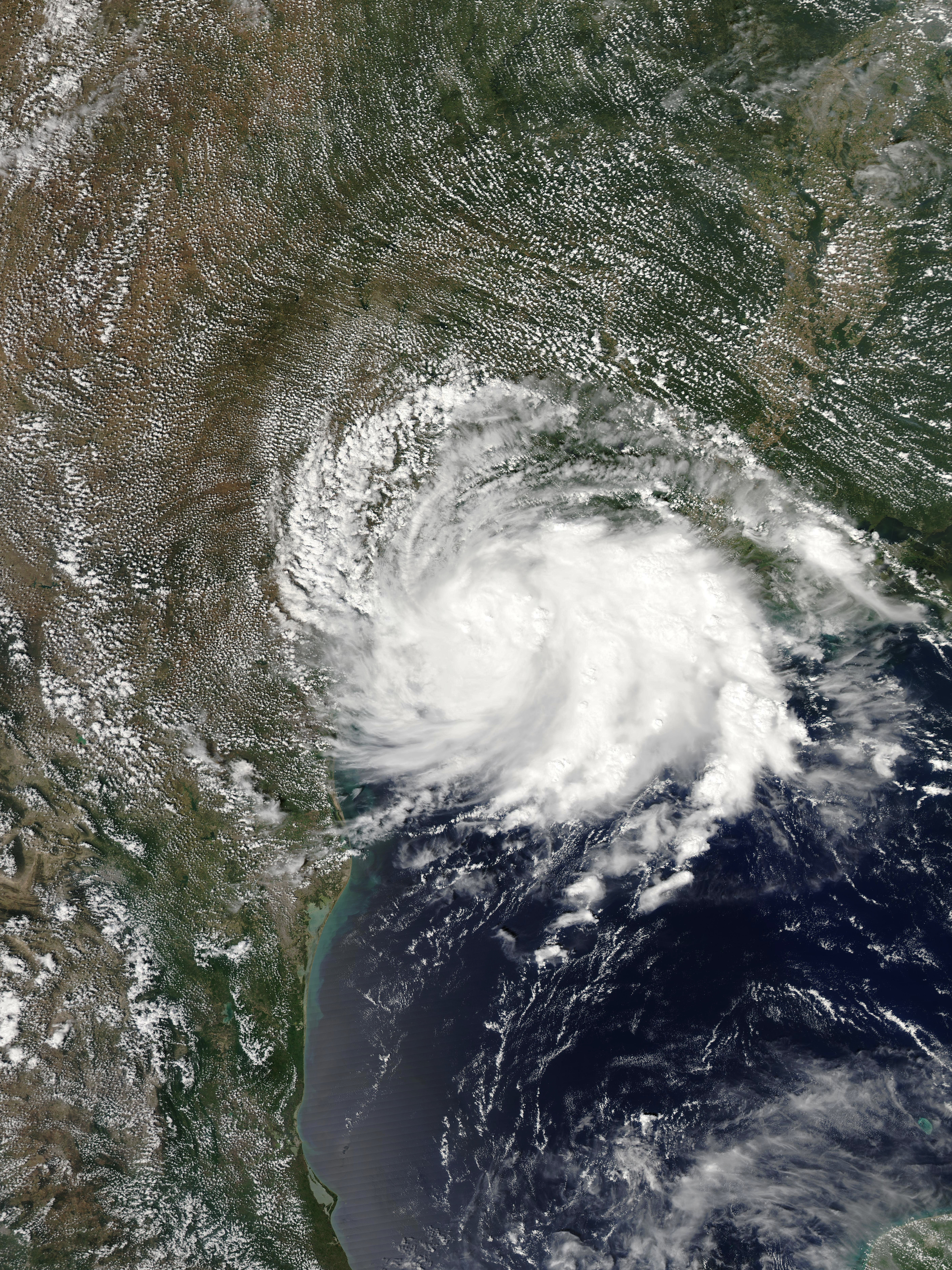
- Tropical Storm Imelda off the coast of Texas on September 17

Meteorological history
- Formed: September 17, 2019
- Dissipated: September 19, 2019

Tropical storm
- 1-minute sustained (SSHWS/NWS)
- Highest winds: 45 mph (75 km/h)
- Lowest pressure: 1003 mbar (hPa); 29.62 inHg

Overall effects
- Fatalities: 7
- Damage: $5 billion (2019 USD)
- Areas affected: Texas, Louisiana, Oklahoma, Arkansas
- IBTrACS
- Part of the 2019 Atlantic hurricane season

Tropical Storm Imelda (/iːˈmɛldɑː/ ee-MEL-dah) was the fourth-wettest tropical cyclone on record in the U.S. state of Texas, causing devastating and record-breaking floods in southeast Texas. The eleventh tropical cyclone and ninth named storm of the 2019 Atlantic hurricane season, Imelda formed out of an upper-level low that developed in the Gulf of Mexico and moved westward. Little development occurred until the system was near the Texas coastline, where it rapidly developed into a tropical storm before moving ashore shortly afterward on September 17. Imelda weakened after landfall, but continued bringing large amounts of flooding rain to Texas and Louisiana, before dissipating on September 21.

Impacts began when Imelda made landfall as a weak tropical storm. The system brought heavy rain and dangerous flooding to parts of southeastern Texas (especially the cities of Galveston and Beaumont) as its motion gradually slowed over land. Dozens of water rescues were needed by September 19 as areas became overwhelmed by the rainfall, with some areas experiencing over 43 inches (1,100 mm) of rain. Total damage is estimated in excess of $5 billion (2019 USD). Imelda was the costliest Atlantic tropical cyclone name to not be retired at the time, with Hurricane Sally being the costliest the following year.

== Meteorological history ==
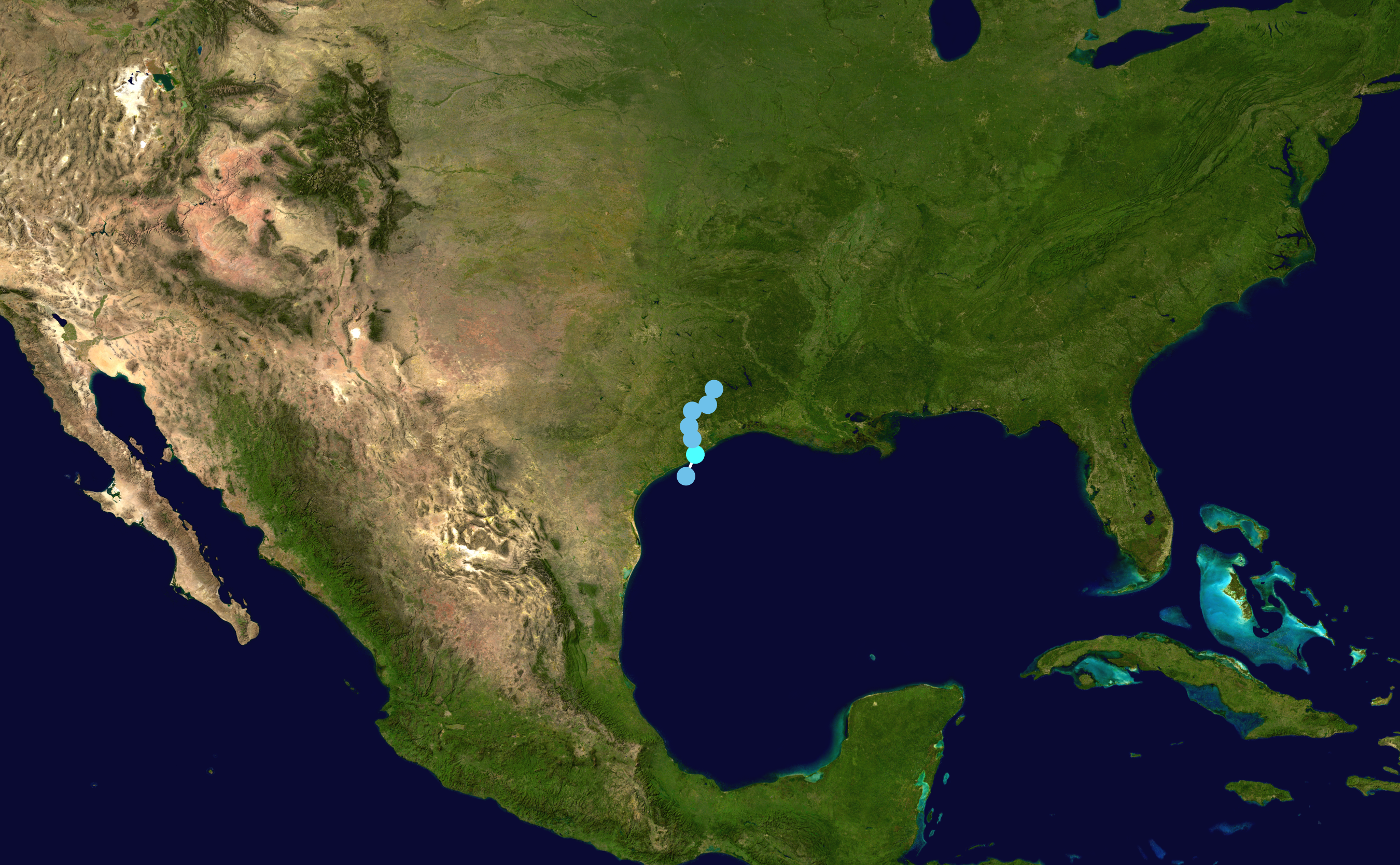
Map plotting the storm's track and intensity, according to the Saffir–Simpson scale Map key Saffir–Simpson scale Tropical depression (≤38 mph, ≤62 km/h) Tropical storm (39–73 mph, 63–118 km/h) Category 1 (74–95 mph, 119–153 km/h) Category 2 (96–110 mph, 154–177 km/h) Category 3 (111–129 mph, 178–208 km/h) Category 4 (130–156 mph, 209–251 km/h) Category 5 (≥157 mph, ≥252 km/h) Unknown Storm type Tropical cyclone Subtropical cyclone Extratropical cyclone, remnant low, tropical disturbance, or monsoon depression

Imelda originated from a mid-to-upper level trough located over the Eastern United States. Between September 10–12, the low moved to the southwest towards the eastern Gulf of Mexico. Once over the Gulf, associated convection began to increase, as a weak surface trough formed within the upper—level low on September 14, traversing to the west—northwest. That same day, the National Hurricane Center (NHC) began to monitor the low for possible tropical cyclogenesis, although they only gave the disturbance a low chance of formation. By September 17, the system had reached the east coast of Texas. Soon afterward, organization in the system rapidly increased, and at 17:00 UTC that day, the system organized into Tropical Depression Eleven, just off the coast of Texas. At 17:45 UTC, an observation deck at Freeport, Texas recorded sustained winds of 40 mph (65 km/h) with gusts of 47 mph (76 km/h), indicating that the depression had strengthened to Tropical Storm Imelda.

Shortly thereafter, at 18:30 UTC, Imelda made landfall near Freeport, Texas at peak intensity, with maximum 1-minute sustained winds of 45 mph (75km/h) and a minimum central pressure of 1,003 millibars (29.6 inHg). Imelda weakened after landfall, becoming a tropical depression at 03:00 UTC on the next day. At that time, the NHC passed on the responsibility for issuing advisories to the Weather Prediction Center (WPC). Imelda retained status as a tropical depression over land for the next 2 days, gradually weakening and slowing its motion, before degenerating into a trough on September 19, as it began passing over Louisiana; Imelda's remnants continued producing heavy rain and a few isolated tornadoes. Imelda's remnants persisted for another couple of days, before dissipating early on September 21.

== Preparations and impact ==
Wettest tropical cyclones and their remnants in Texas Highest-known totals
Precipitation			Storm	Location	Ref.
Rank	mm	in	Storm	Location	Ref.
1	1538.7	60.58	Harvey 2017	Nederland	
2	1219.2	48.00	Amelia 1978	Medina	
3	1143.0	45.00	Claudette 1979	Alvin coop site	
4	1096	43.15	Imelda 2019	Jefferson County	
5	1033.3	40.68	Allison 2001	Moore Road Detention Pond	
6	1008.6	39.71	September Hurricane 1921	Thrall	
7	762.0	30.00	September T.S. 1936	Broome	
8	755.9	29.76	Unnamed 1960	Port Lavaca #2	
9	695.5	27.38	Beulah 1967	Pettus	
10	688.3	27.10	Alice 1954	Pandale	

=== Texas ===
Imelda's slow movement over Southeast Texas and a continuous influx of tropical moisture led to copious amounts of rainfall over the region. This moisture supported the formation of rainbands that repeatedly moved across the same areas of Southeast Texas between September 17–19. Several counties spanning parts of the Greater Houston metropolitan area and Beaumont, recorded over 30 in (760 mm) of rain. A maximum rainfall total of 44.29 in (1,125 mm) was documented at a station 2 mi (3.2 km) south-southwest of Fannett; this made Imelda the seventh-wettest tropical cyclone in U.S. history, fifth-wettest in the contiguous U.S., and fourth-wettest in Texas history. The same station recorded 31 in (790 mm) of rain in 12 hours. Rain fell at over 5 in (130 mm) per hour in several places. Flood depths in some locations exceeded those recorded in Hurricane Harvey due to the high rainfall rates. Where rainfall was heaviest, the rainfall total represented a 1-in-1000-year rainfall event. Destructive flooding occurred along I-10 between Winnie and Orange, where over 42 in (1,100 mm) of rain fell. Over one thousand vehicles were caught in flood waters. Many homes and businesses were also flooded, resulting in numerous high-water rescues. Approximately 8,200 homes were flooded in Harris, Jefferson, Liberty, and Montgomery counties. Five deaths were directly attributed to the floods, of which three occurred in Jefferson, while two occurred in Harris County. The National Centers for Environmental Information estimated Imelda inflicted $5 billion in damage.

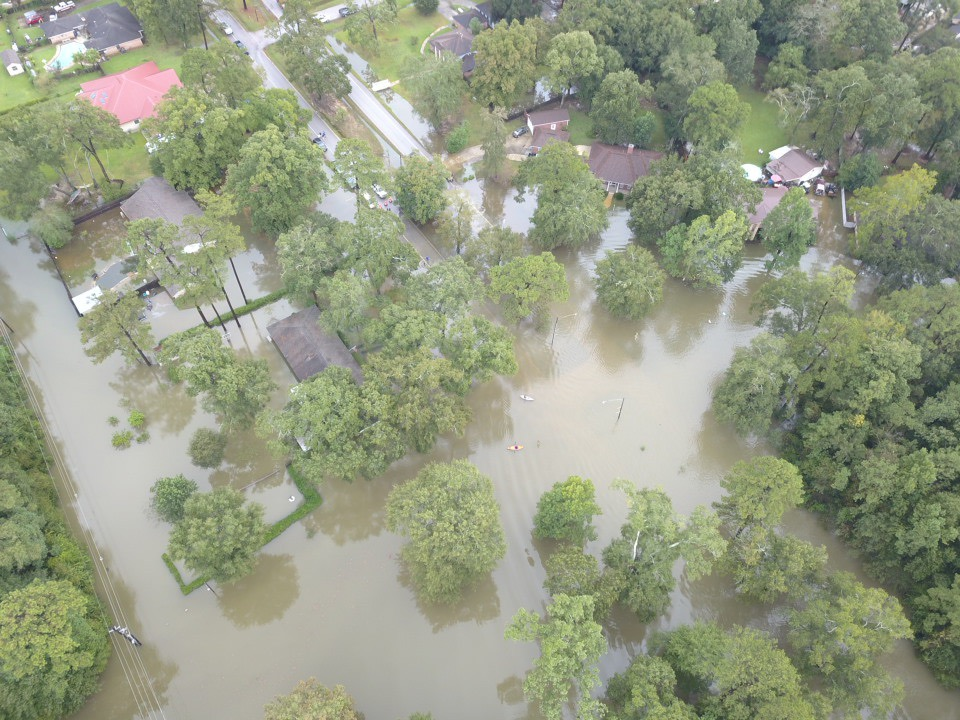
Aerial view of flooding in Roman Forest, Texas.

Jefferson County was the most heavily impacted by Imelda. An estimated 5,100 homes were flooded in the county, suffering $14 million in damage. Major street flooding occurred in Beaumont where the flooding first began. Over 38 inches (97 cm) of rain fell in the city. Encroaching floodwaters prompted the evacuation of Riceland Medical Center in Chambers County. Stream flooding persisted for days in Hardin County, where 10–40 in (250–1,020 mm) of rain was measured. Many buildings and roads were rendered impassable. There were 60 homes were flooded in the county, resulting in $2.3 million in damage. In Orange County, Imelda flooded 2,679 homes, resulting in $12 million in damage. Near Mauriceville, Cow Bayou reached its second-highest crest on record. In Jasper and Newton counties, an estimated $2.4 million in damage was incurred following the flooding of 15 homes.

In Houston, Imelda's rainfall caused many of the local bayous to overtop their banks and flood residential areas. More than 1,000 people were rescued from floodwaters. All bus and rail services were temporarily shut down in the city. A roof of a United States Postal Service building collapsed, leaving three people with minor injuries. George Bush Intercontinental Airport closed for about 90 minutes due to flooding on the runways, canceling 655 flights. Throughout Houston, hundreds of homes were affected by flooding and more than 1,600 vehicles were towed. In Harris County alone, 422 people required high-water rescue; the Texas National Guard rescued 130 people. During the flood, nine barges escaped a shipyard, and at least two struck the I-10 bridge over the San Jacinto River, causing visible damage to some of the columns supporting the highway. The bridge was subsequently closed to traffic in both directions. Significant flooding occurred in Splendora, inundating parts of FM 2090 and US 59, as well as gas pumps at a filling station.

Within the weeks following Imelda, aid from FEMA was not received. This left some residents uncertain if any would come.

=== Elsewhere ===
Costliest Non-retired Hurricanes
Rank	Cyclone	Season	Damage
1	Sally	2020	$7.3 billion
2	Isaias	2020	$5.02 billion
3	Imelda	2019	$5.0 billion
4	Debby	2024	$4.5 billion
5	Zeta	2020	$4.4 billion
6	Karl	2010	$3.9 billion
7	Idalia	2023	$3.6 billion
8	Isaac	2012	$3.11 billion
9	Delta	2020	$3.09 billion
10	Lee	2011	$2.8 billion

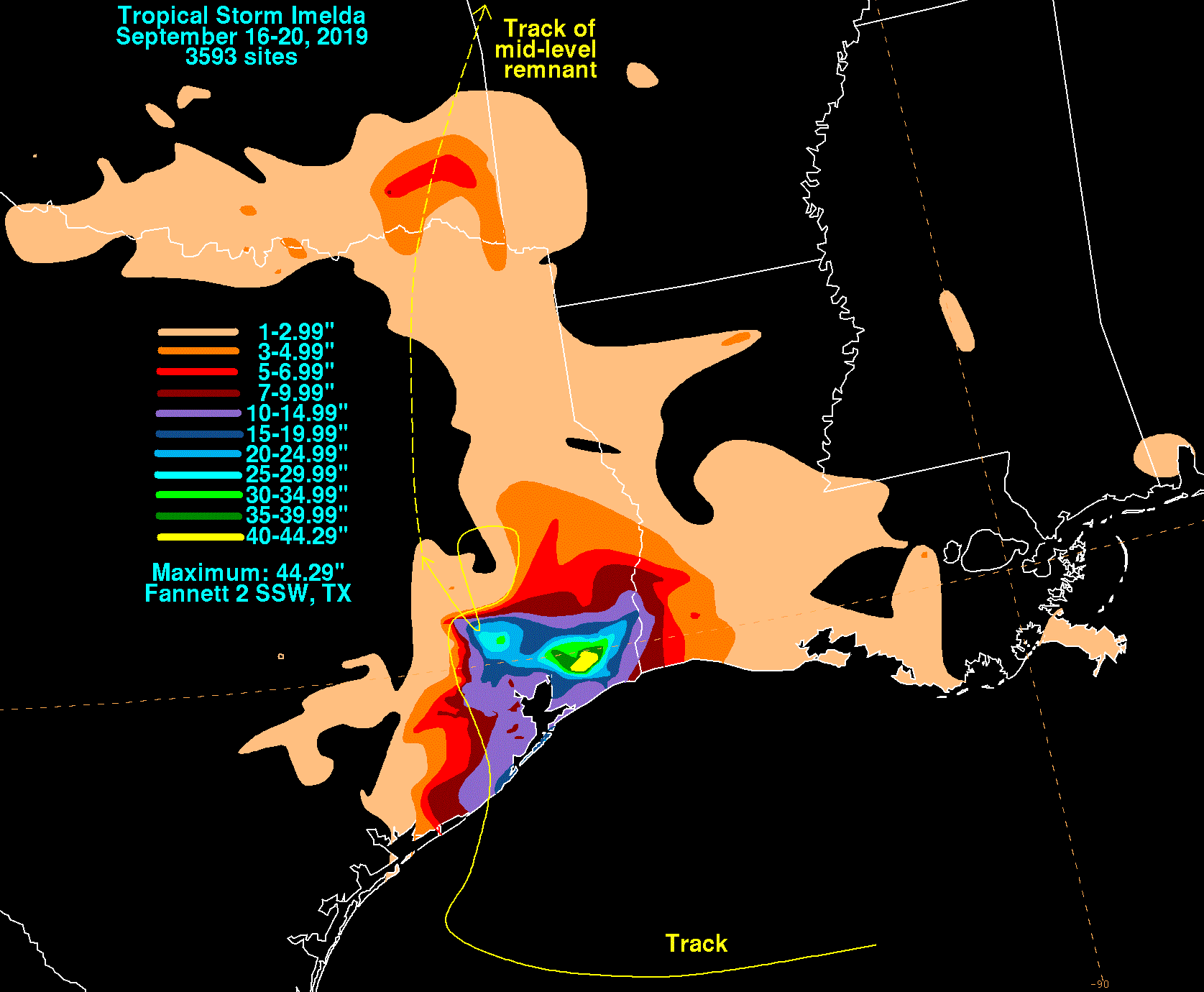
The heaviest rains from Imelda, exceeding 40 in (1,000 mm), were concentrated in a small area in southeastern Texas while lighter rainfall extended to nearby states.

Flooding from Imelda in southwestern Louisiana was relatively minor. Freshwater flooding in Johnson Bayou inundated most secondary roads and was augmented by the elevated tide levels caused by the tropical storm. The remnants of Imelda produced up to 7.6 in (190 mm) of rain in southeastern Oklahoma between September 6–7. Heavy rainfall also occurred in portions of Arkansas.

In addition to the rain, weather stations reported winds between 37 and 44 mph (59–70 km/h) as Imelda made landfall. At Baton Rouge Metropolitan Airport, an embedded thunderstorm within one of Imelda's rainbands produced a microburst that flipped four airplanes and damaged hangar doors on September 17; the airport registered a peak gust of 66 mph (106 km/h). Storm surge also resulted in minor coastal flooding along the upper Texas and Louisiana coasts, inundating areas with 1–2 ft (0.30–0.61 m) of water. A National Ocean Service gauge at Eagle Point, Texas, measured a peak surge height of 2.35 ft (0.72 m) above normal tide levels. After September 17, freshwater runoff originating from inland flooding reached the coast and exacerbated the initial storm surge flooding. A gauge on Buffalo Bayou documented water levels 4.32 ft (1.32 m) above normal tide levels once runoff reached the coast. Imelda also produced two confirmed tornadoes: an EF1 tornado unroofed a home and downed large tree limbs on in Harris County, Texas on September 18 and an EF0 tornado flipped a recreational vehicle and knocked down several trees near Hackberry, Louisiana, in Cameron Parish on September 19.

== See also ==
- Other storms of the same name
- Tropical cyclones in 2019
- List of Texas hurricanes (1980–present)
- List of wettest tropical cyclones in the United States
- Tropical Storm Allison (1989) – A tropical storm that had similar intensity, stalled over Eastern Texas/Western Louisiana, causing $560 million with severe flooding.
- Tropical Storm Allison (2001) – Another system of a similar intensity that stalled over Texas and caused severe flooding.
- Hurricane Harvey (2017) – A Category 4 hurricane that also caused catastrophic flooding in the same region when it stalled as a tropical storm.
