= Broome (name) =

Broome is both a surname and a given name. Notable people with the name include:

== Surname ==
- Albert Broome (1900–1989), British soccer player
- Bob Broome (1916–1959), American football coach
- Christopher Edmund Broome (1812–1886), British mycologist
- David Broome (born 1940), British equestrian
- Ernest James Broome (1908–1975), Canadian politician
- Emilia Broomé (1866–1925), Swedish politician, feminist and peace activist
- Frank Broome (1915–1994), English footballer
- Frederick Broome (1842–1896), Australian politician
- Harvey Broome (1902–1968), American lawyer, writer and conservationist
- Ian Broome (born 1960), English cricketer
- Jack Broome (1901–1985), Royal Navy officer
- James E. Broome (1808–1883), American politician
- Jerry Broome (born 1966), American actor
- John Broome (disambiguation), multiple people
- Johni Broome (born 2002), American basketball player
- Lewis Broome (born 1991), Australian Rules footballer
- Mary Anne Broome, Lady Broome (1831–1911), New Zealand writer Mary Anne Barker
- Matthew Broome, British actor
- Olivia Broome, British para powerlifter
- Paul Broome (born 1976), American soccer player
- Ralph Broome (pamphleteer) (1742–1805), English stockjobber and pamphleteer
- Ralph Broome (bobsledder) (1889–1985), British Olympic bobsledder
- Sharon Weston Broome (born 1956), American politician
- William Broome (1689–1745), British poet and translator
- William Broome (1873–1942), New Zealand manufacturer/tailor, see Swanndri

== Given name ==
- Broome Pinniger (1902–1996), Indian field hockey player

== See also ==
- Broom (surname)
