= List of storms named Imelda =

The name Imelda has been used for three tropical cyclones worldwide: two in the Atlantic Ocean and one in the South-West Indian Ocean.

In the Atlantic:

- Tropical Storm Imelda (2019) – short-lived weak tropical storm that made landfall in Texas where it caused devastating flooding
- Hurricane Imelda (2025) – Category 1 hurricane that affected the Greater Antilles, The Bahamas and Bermuda

In the South-West Indian:

- Cyclone Imelda (2013) – did not affect land
