= Tram Hollow (Oregon County, Missouri) =

Valley in the U.S. state of Missouri

Coordinates: 36.847555°N 91.319301°W

Tram Hollow is a valley in Oregon County in the U.S. state of Missouri.

Tram Hollow was so named on account of the tramway the valley once contained.
