= Oakley, Suffolk =

Village in Suffolk, England

Coordinates: 52.358°N 1.176°E

Oakley
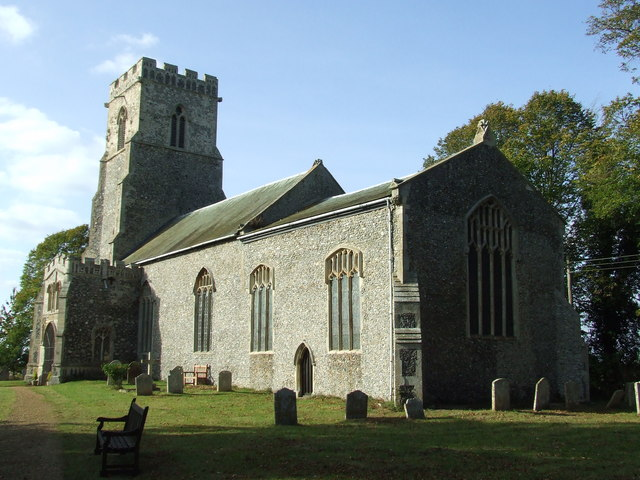
- The Church of St Nicholas at Oakley

- Location within Suffolk
- OS grid reference: TM165780
- Civil parish: Brome and Oakley
- District: Mid Suffolk
- Shire county: Suffolk
- Region: East
- Country: England
- Sovereign state: United Kingdom
- Post town: Diss
- Postcode district: IP21
- Dialling code: 01379
- UK Parliament: Central Suffolk and North Ipswich

Oakley is a village and former civil parish in the Mid Suffolk district, in the north of the English county of Suffolk. It lies immediately to the south of the River Waveney around 3 miles (4.8 km) north-east of Eye and the same distance south-east of Diss. The village of Scole is 1 mile (1.6 km) north-east across the River Waveney. In 1961 the parish had a population of 204. The village is in the parish of Brome and Oakley and the benefice has been combined with the village of Brome for centuries but the civil parish was only combined on 1 April 1982.

The village church is dedicated to St Nicholas. It is a Grade II* listed building dating from the 14th century.

== History ==
On 19 July 1960 Victor XH617, of 57 Squadron from RAF Honington, crashed with three killed and two survivors. The aircraft hit the Norfolk-Suffolk border at Warren Hill. One survivor parachuted onto electricity cables.
