= Henry Morse =

English Roman Catholic saint

Saint Henry Morse S.J.
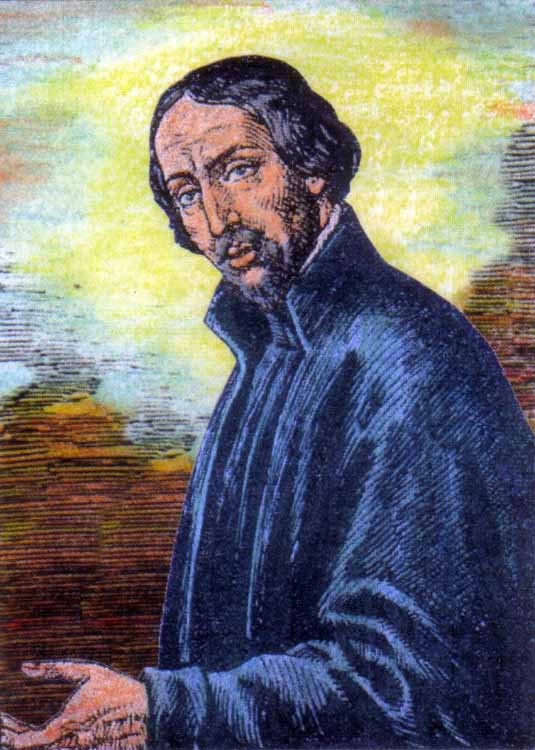

Priest and Martyr
- Born: c. 1595; Brome, Suffolk, England
- Died: 1 February 1645 (aged 49 - 50); Tyburn, London, England
- Venerated in: Roman Catholic Church
- Beatified: 15 December 1929, Rome by Pope Pius XI
- Canonized: 25 October 1970, Rome by Pope Paul VI
- Major shrine: St. Henry Morse RC Church, Diss
- Feast: 1 February; 25 October (as part of the 40 Martyrs)

Henry Morse (1595 – 1 February 1645) was one of the Catholic Forty Martyrs of England and Wales.

== Biography ==
Henry Morse was born a Protestant in 1595 at his grandmother's house at Brome in the English county of Suffolk, the son of Robert Morse, a minor landowner of Tivetshall St Mary, Norfolk.

At the age of 16, Henry went to study law at Corpus Christi College, Cambridge and continued at Gray's Inn, London. Upon his father's death in 1614, he went to France to join his brother William, who was at Douai studying to be a priest. Morse converted to Roman Catholicism at the English College, Douay. He returned to England to settle some financial arrangements and was arrested at Dover for refusing to take the Oath of allegiance and confined to Southwark gaol.

Morse remained incarcerated with a number of priests for four years, until King James I of England ordered amnesty and banishment for about 100 priests, in furtherance of negotiations to arrange a Spanish marriage for his son Prince Charles. He arrived back at Douai in August 1618 and was sent to the English College in Rome to commence his studies. While there, he used the alias "Henry Claxon" to shield his identity from the Crown's spies.

He was ordained at Rome and left for the English Mission on 19 June 1624. Morse was assigned to assist the Jesuits at Newcastle-upon-Tyne, where later that year there was an outbreak of plague. Morse and his companions nursed the sick. The following year he was arrested and later moved from Newcastle Gaol to York Castle where he again tended the sick. He completed his novitiate under his fellow prisoner, Father John Robinson, and took simple vows as a Jesuit. After three years in prison he was banished from the country and served as a missionary to the English and Irish soldiers attached to the Spanish army in the Low Countries.

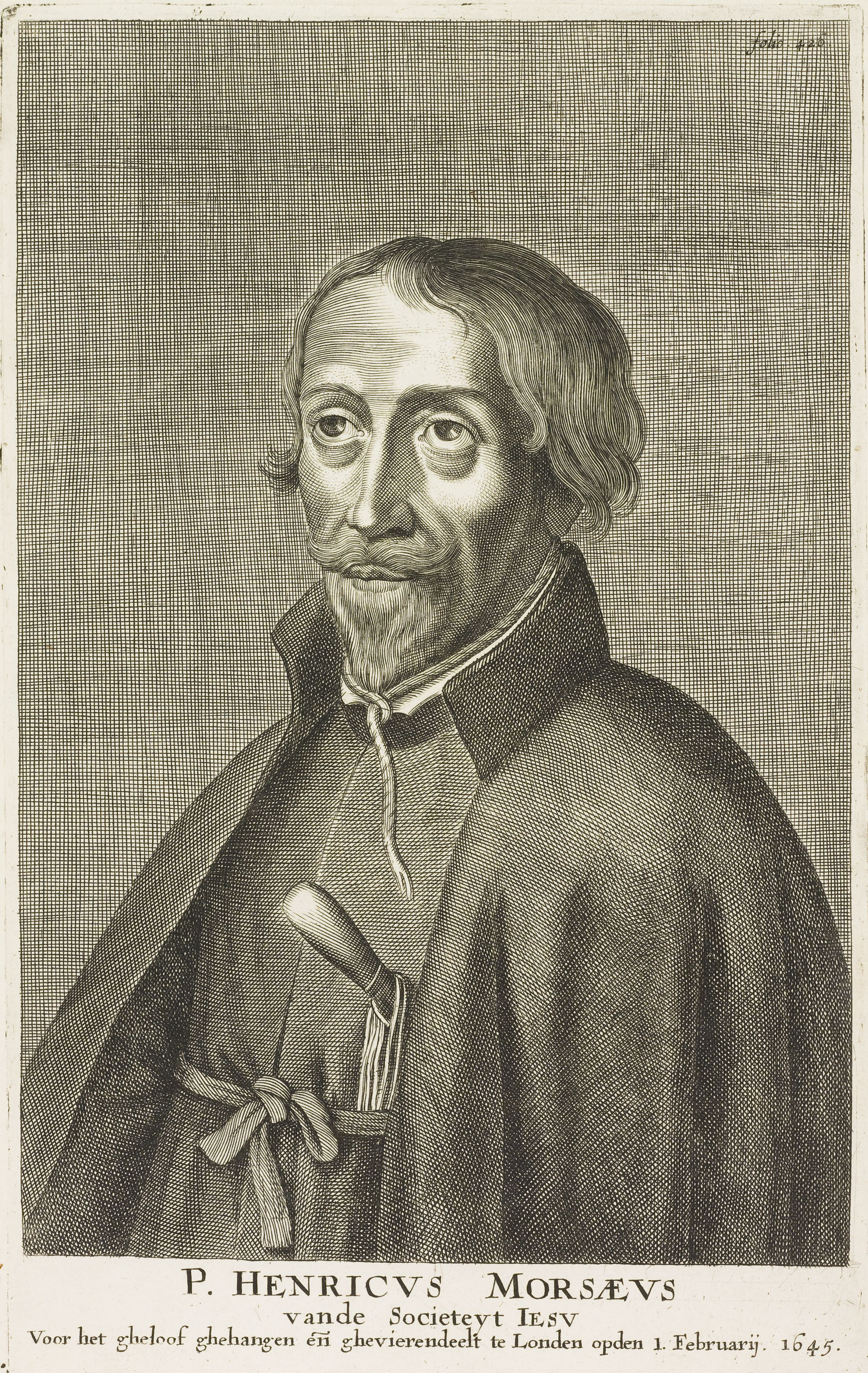
Henricus Morsæus

Returning to England at the end of 1633 he laboured in London, in the St Giles-in-the-Fields area. In 1635 plague was brought on boats from Flanders. Morse himself contracted the illness while nursing the sick, but recovered. Here he worked with John Southworth, raising funds for food and medicine. Arrested on 27 February 1636, he was imprisoned in Newgate. On 22 April he was brought to the bar charged with being a priest and having withdrawn the king's subjects from their faith and allegiance. He was found guilty on the first count, not guilty on the second, and his sentence was deferred. On 23 April he made his solemn profession of the three vows to Father Edward Lusher. He was released on bail for 10,000 florins, 20 June 1637, at the insistence of Queen Henriette Maria. In order to free his sureties he voluntarily went into exile when the royal proclamation was issued ordering all priests to leave the country before 7 April 1641, and became chaplain to Gage's English regiment in the service of Spain.

In 1643, he returned to England; arrested after about a year and a half he was imprisoned at Durham and Newcastle, and sent by sea to London. By this time the (strongly anti-Catholic) Parliamentarians were in power in the capital, meaning that Morse could no longer be saved by a royal intervention. On 30 January 1645, he was again brought to the bar and condemned on his previous conviction. On 1 February 1645 his hurdle was drawn by four horses and the French ambassador attended with all his suite, as also did Lois, Count of Egmont, and the Portuguese Ambassador. Morse was allowed to hang until he was dead. At the quartering, the footmen of the French Ambassador and of the Count of Egmont dipped their handkerchiefs into Morse's blood.

Venerated from 8 December 1929, and beatified on 15 December 1929, he was named one of the Forty Martyrs of England and Wales in 1970.

In 2012, a Catholic church dedicated to Henry Morse was built on Shelfanger Road in Diss, replacing the church of the Most Holy Trinity.
