= Tram Hollow (Ripley County, Missouri) =

Valley in the United States

Coordinates: 36.804499°N 91.072074°W

Tram Hollow is a valley in Ripley County in the U.S. state of Missouri.

Tram Hollow was so named on account of the tramway the valley once contained.
