= John Southworth (martyr) =

English Roman Catholic saint

Saint John Southworth

Martyr
- Born: c. 1592; Lancashire, England
- Died: 28 June 1654; Tyburn, London, England
- Venerated in: Catholic Church
- Beatified: 15 December 1929, Rome by Pope Pius XI
- Canonized: 25 October 1970, Rome by Pope Paul VI
- Major shrine: Westminster Cathedral
- Feast: 27 June (Diocese of Westminster, 25 October (with the Forty Martyrs of England and Wales)
- Attributes: chasuble, martyr's palm
- Patronage: priests

John Southworth (c. 1592, Lancashire, England - 28 June 1654, Tyburn, London) was an English Catholic martyr. He is one of the Forty Martyrs of England and Wales.

== History ==
John Southworth came from a Lancashire family who lived at Samlesbury Hall. They chose to pay heavy fines rather than give up the Catholic faith.

He studied at the English College in Douai, in northern France. (The college later relocated to St Edmund's College, Ware in Hertfordshire.) In 1585, a law had been passed branding as treasonable any priest who dared to come back to England. The law was later extended to all who assisted such priests.

Southworth was ordained priest before he returned to England 13 October 1619, where he remained until 1624, when he was then recalled to serve as chaplain to Benedictine nuns in Brussels.

After about a year, he returned to Lancashire, where he was arrested in 1627 and imprisoned in Lancaster Castle along with Edmund Arrowsmith. Arrowsmith was hanged, drawn, and quartered at Lancaster on 28 August 1628. Southworth was later moved to The Clink in London. He was sentenced to death for professing the Catholic faith, but in 1630, at the insistence of Queen Henrietta Maria, he and seventeen others were delivered to the French ambassador and deported to France.

By 1636, he had returned to England and lived in Clerkenwell, London, during a plague epidemic. He and Henry Morse ministered to the sick in Westminster, and raised money for the families of victims. Southworth was arrested again in November 1637 and sent to the Gatehouse Prison and again transferred to The Clink, where he remained for three years. Four times Southworth was arrested, and three times released by the Secretary of State Sir Francis Windebank at the direction of the Queen. The fourth time he managed to escape. From 1640 and 1654 he continued his clandestine ministry.

He was again arrested under the Interregnum and was tried at the Old Bailey under Elizabethan anti-priest legislation. He pleaded guilty to exercising the priesthood and was sentenced to be hanged, drawn and quartered. He was executed at Tyburn, London.

The Spanish ambassador returned his corpse to Douai for burial. His corpse was sewn together and parboiled, to preserve it. Following the French Revolution, his body was buried in an unmarked grave for its protection. The grave was discovered in 1927 and his remains were returned to England. They are now kept in the Chapel of St George and the English Martyrs in Westminster Cathedral in London.

== Veneration ==
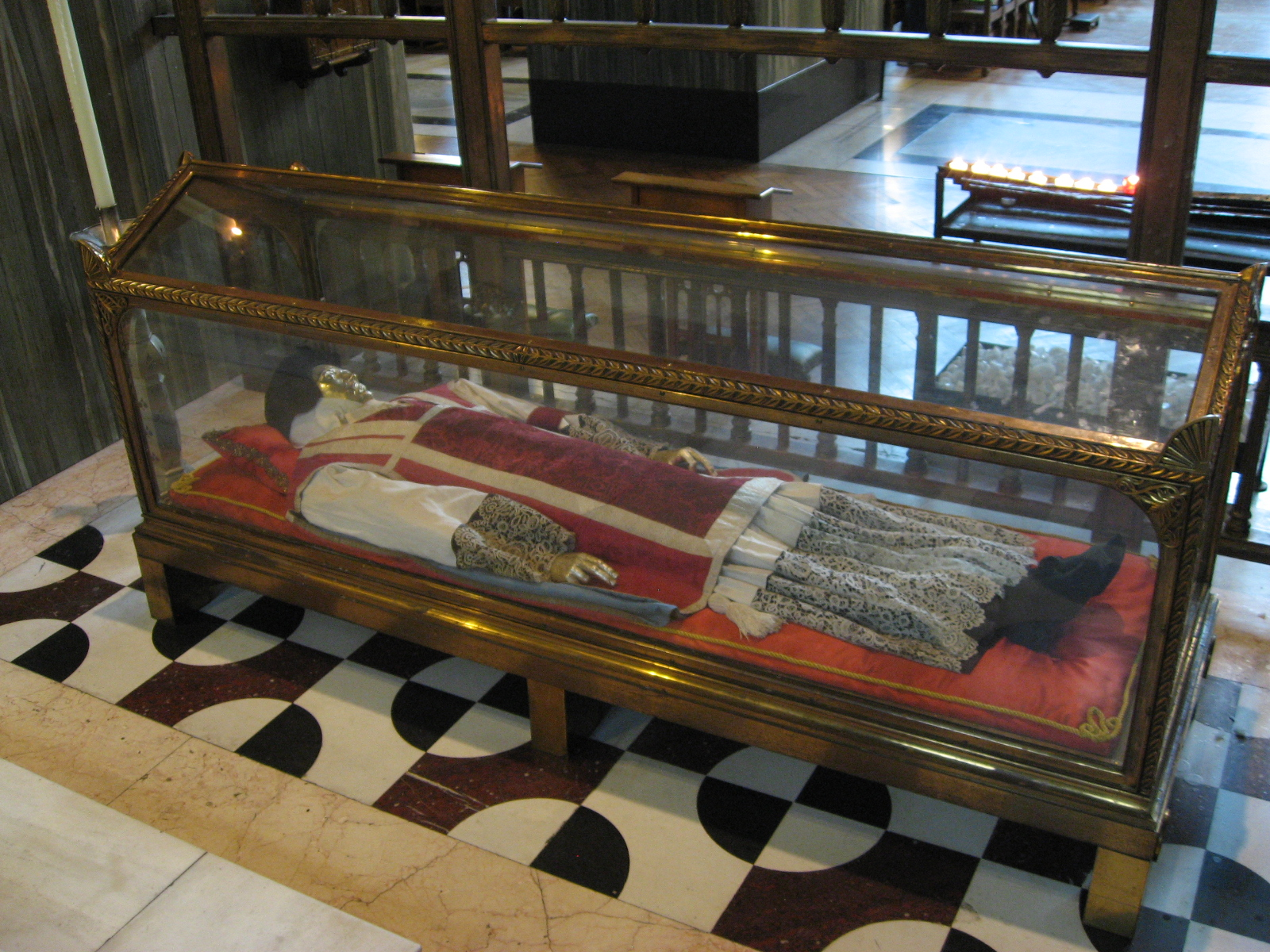
Reliquary of Saint John Southworth in Westminster Cathedral

He was beatified in 1929. In 1970, he was canonized by Pope Paul VI as one of the Forty Martyrs of England and Wales. His feast day is 27 June celebrated in the Westminster diocese. He is a patron saint of priests.

In 2014, The Guild of Saint John Southworth was established in Westminster Cathedral. Its members are volunteers who will meet visitors, answer their questions and guide them around the cathedral if they wish. This service is free.
