= Sterling County, Texas =

County in Texas, United States

- County
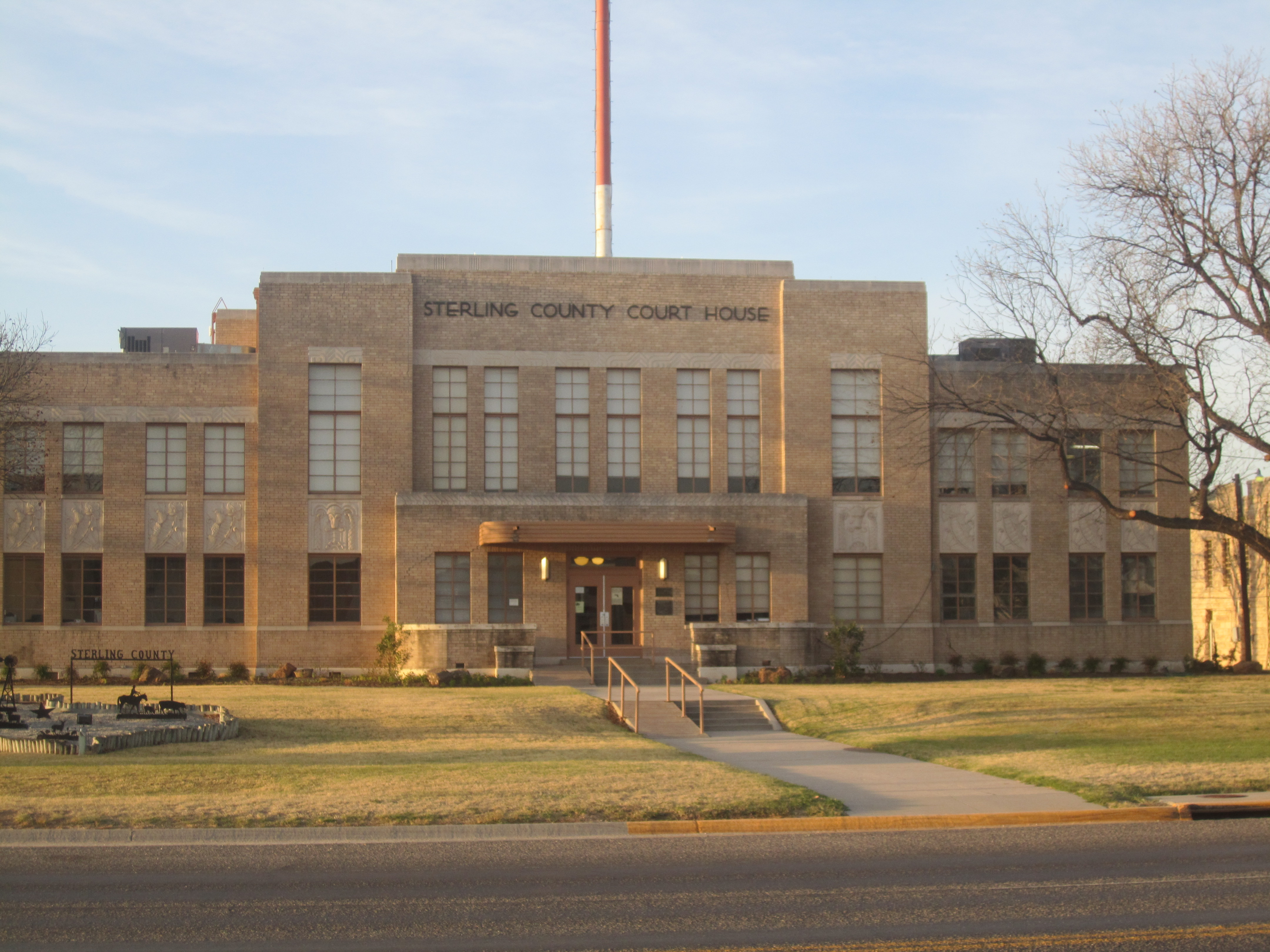
- Sterling County Court House off U.S. Highway 87 in Sterling City

- Location within the U.S. state of Texas
- Coordinates: 31°49′N 101°03′W
- Country: United States
- State: Texas
- Founded: 1891
- Named for: W. S. Sterling, an early settler
- Seat: Sterling City
- Largest city: Sterling City

Area
  - Total: 924 sq mi (2,390 km^{2})
  - Land: 923 sq mi (2,390 km^{2})
  - Water: 0.1 sq mi (0.26 km^{2}) 0.01%

Population (2020)
  - Total: 1,372
  - Estimate (2025): 1,349 ▼
  - Density: 1.49/sq mi (0.574/km^{2})
- Time zone: UTC−6 (Central)
  - Summer (DST): UTC−5 (CDT)
- Congressional district: 11th
- Website: www.sterlingcotx.gov

Sterling County is a county located on the Edwards Plateau in the U.S. state of Texas. As of the 2020 census, its population was 1,372, making it the ninth-least populous county in Texas. Its county seat is Sterling City. The county is named for W. S. Sterling, an early settler in the area. Sterling County was one of 30 prohibition, or entirely dry, counties in the state of Texas, but is now a moist county.

== History ==
=== Native peoples and frontier conflict ===
The region was home to the indigenous peoples of the Great Plains including the Comanche, Lipan Apache, Kiowa, and Kickapoo. As ranchers moved in during the 1870s, clashes followed. One deadly fight between area ranchmen and Comanche raiders took place in the 1870s on Lacy Creek, on land now part of the McEntire | Cole Campstool Ranch, formerly part of the U Ranch. W. K. Kellis described it in the Sterling City News-Record as "The Fight at Live Oak Mott," and J. Marvin Hunter later republished the account in Frontier Times.

In 1879, a band of 19 Quahada Comanche under Black Horse left Fort Sill in Indian Territory on May 29 to hunt buffalo. Finding none after a month, they killed a horse on the U Ranch near the headwaters of the Concho River, in Howard County. The Texas Rangers pursued them, and the fight that followed is often described as the last significant battle between the Rangers and the Comanche.

Doyle Phillips now disputes this account. In The Comanches' Last Raid Inquiry, he argues that the raiders were probably not Comanche, and possibly Apache, but most likely non-Native horse thieves, and that the raid story covered up the unexplained killing of a Texas Ranger. Phillips also states that several Rangers were dismissed for cowardice after the incident, the first such dismissals in Ranger history.

=== Early settlement ===
The area was within the 1842 Fisher–Miller Land Grant, but no settlement resulted. Between 1800 and 1860, Fur traders, Texas Rangers, and federal troops passed through. Camp Elizabeth began as a Ranger camp around 1853 and served as an outpost hospital for Fort Concho from 1874 to 1886.

A few buffalo hunters arrived before the American Civil War. W. S. Sterling settled around 1858, as did fellow hunter S. J. Wiley. Sterling later became a U.S. Marshal in Arizona and was killed in an Apache ambush near Fort Apache. Local legend holds that Frank and Jesse James hid out on Sterling Creek in the 1870s, raising horses and hunting buffalo.

Lasting settlement came after the Civil War, once the buffalo herds were gone and the Native tribes had been forced out of the region.

=== Land and the open range ===
Texas paid for railroad construction with public land. Under laws dating to the 1850s and carried into the Constitution of 1876, a railroad company surveyed land along its route in blocks of one-square-mile sections, each 640 acres. The company kept the odd-numbered sections, and the even-numbered sections between them went to the state's Permanent School Fund. The company then had 12 years to sell its land, and the result was a checkerboard in which every railroad section was bordered on all four sides by state land.

Cattle outfits, usually the first buyers in an area, bought up the railroad sections. The state sections between them sat unsold and unfenced, so an outfit that owned half the land in a block could graze all of it, moving herds and reaching water without paying anyone. That changed in 1883, when a new homestead law opened the school sections to settlers. As newcomers fenced their land and drought dried up surface water, tensions with the established outfits grew into the Fence Cutting Wars.

=== The cattle era ===
In the 1870s, three large outfits dominated the area: the Half Circle S, established by the Peacock brothers; the MS, set up by Schuster, Henry, and Company; and the “U” Ranch.

J. D. Earnest and W. J. Holland founded the “U” Ranch in 1876, the first ranch west of San Angelo in what was then Tom Green County. It passed to M. B. Stephenson, who sold the 80,000-acre property in 1879 to Colonel William Randolph McEntire. The ranch began about six miles northwest of Sterling City on the North Concho River and followed it northwest through Glasscock County to the river's headwaters in Howard County, with Sterling Creek on its east and southeast side. Its neighbors were the Renderbrook Spade Ranch in Mitchell County to the northeast and J. B. Slaughter's ranch to the northwest. The ranch ran three headquarters, 12 to 25 miles apart: one on the Concho, one at the mouth of Sterling Creek, and one at the creek's headwaters. The ranch ran three headquarters, 12 to 25 miles apart: one on the Concho, one at the mouth of Sterling Creek, and one at the creek's headwaters.

Between 1880 and 1900, McEntire bought land in Glasscock, Howard, Mitchell, Nolan, Sterling, Tom Green, and Reagan counties, enlarging the ranch to more than 250,000 owned acres, about 105,000 of them in Glasscock and Reagan counties. At its widest it ran from 12 miles west of Garden City to Grierson's Spring in Reagan County, between the heads of the Concho and Pecos rivers, taking in the stretch of the Goodnight-Loving Trail between the two rivers and bordering the Seven-D Ranch near Fort Stockton. Counting the unsold state sections within its checkerboard, the “U” Ranch controlled roughly 500,000 acres and grazed up to 50,000 head of cattle across five counties.

From 1875 to the mid-1880s, outfits drove herds north to Colorado City, the nearest railhead. The “U” Ranch shipped its cattle to pasture or feedlots in Arkansas, Kansas, Nebraska, Wyoming, and the Marlow area of Indian Territory, and from there to market in Fort Worth, Kansas City, Chicago, and St. Louis. In 1882, McEntire, J. B. Wilson, and C. C. Slaughter moved 89 carloads of cattle, mostly overland, to rangeland near Orin Junction, Wyoming, controlled by the Driskill brothers, who also owned a hotel in Austin. The cattle weighed 600 to 800 pounds on arrival and nearly 1,400 pounds within two years.

By 1888, McEntire's eldest son, R. Billie McEntire, was running the drives, testing feed types at the feedlots and selling once prices reached set targets. His last drive, in 1893, met a blizzard near the Renderbrook Spade Ranch. R. Billie knew the Spade's owners, the Snyder brothers, so he cut their perimeter fence and drove more than 1,000 head into the ranch's main horse pasture while his crew waited out the storm at the Spade headquarters. Losses were small. The herd went on to feedlots in Pine Bluff, Arkansas, where R. Billie held it for 10 months until the Fort Worth market was right.

Ranching and banking were closely tied in the McEntire family. Colonel McEntire founded and controlled the American National Bank in Dallas with C. C. Slaughter, owner of the Lazy S Ranch. While in Arkansas with the 1893 herd, R. Billie married Eudora Fowler and then moved to Dallas to work at the bank. His younger brother, George H. McEntire, also trained there before returning to run the ranch.

=== Fencing, drought, and the end of the open range ===
In 1883, under a new homestead law, Texas began selling its school sections to settlers on a first-come, first-served basis. Counties advertised available land, and long lines formed at county clerks' offices. Ranchers competed for the same tracts; McEntire sent agents from Tom Green County to hold places in line until his chosen sections were secured. In 1884 he also bought 10,000 acres west of Sterling City, near where Lacy Creek meets the Concho, as a buffer against homesteaders.

Settlers fenced their new land, and in places large owners fenced public land as well. When drought struck in 1883, fences cut cattle off from grass and surface water, and ranch hands and homesteaders began cutting wire. The Fence Cutting Wars ran from 1883 to 1888. Newspapers condemned the cutters and owners hired armed guards. At Governor John Ireland's urging, the legislature made fence cutting and pasture burning crimes punishable by prison and regulated how fences could be built. Cutting declined, though sporadic violence continued through 1888.

One homesteader of the period was James Jefferson Lafayott Glass of North Carolina, who arrived in 1883, herded sheep, cooked for the Rocking Chair outfit, and then rode for the Half Circle S at a line camp on Lacy Creek about 17 miles west of Sterling City. In 1889 he homesteaded that same site, buying his first 640 acres at $1 an acre. The Glass Ranch later grew to more than 32,000 acres in Sterling and Glasscock counties.

A second drought in 1886 and 1887 finished what fencing had started. The Half Circle S and the MS went bankrupt, and by 1890 the open range era was over. The “U” Ranch survived by converting its checkerboard into contiguous land, buying even-numbered sections that included former Half Circle S acreage. In 1890 McEntire sold his 105,000 acres in Glasscock and Reagan counties, with 3,000 cattle and 100 horses, to J. B. Slaughter, whose first U Lazy S Ranch operated there until he moved to Borden and Garza counties in 1898. In 1896, R. Billie McEntire bought about 10,000 more acres next to the “U” Ranch headquarters, including parts of the Half Circle S, Kennedy, and Peacock-Kellogg ranches.

Of the area's early large cattle outfits, only the “U” Ranch and its successor ranches endure.

=== Legacy ranches ===
==== “U” Ranch ====
In 1906, Colonel McEntire divided his ranching estate between his two sons, R. Billie and George McEntire, while his daughter received his non-agricultural property.

R. Billie McEntire's line. In 1906, R. Billie bought an additional 10,000 acres in Nolan and Mitchell counties and moved his family to Colorado City. Around 1915, his four sons, Fowler, James H., W.R. Jr., and R.B. Jr., formed the McEntire Brothers partnership to run about 20,000 acres split between Sterling County and Nolan and Mitchell counties. In 1927, R. Billie sold his Sterling County land to his sons, and Fowler and James H. later consolidated full ownership. The partnership dissolved in 1928 as each brother took over his own operation.

Campstool Ranch. James H. McEntire established the Campstool Ranch in its present form by 1925, on land his grandfather had bought in 1879. After James died in 1937, his widow, Sudie Rawls McEntire, ran it until 1955, when their daughter, Jamie Sue McEntire Cole, and her husband, Bill James Cole, took over; they became full owners in 1981. Under the Coles the operation grew to about 35,000 acres in Crockett, Glasscock, Sterling, and Val Verde counties. They built a sheep feedlot for 32,000 head on the ranch in 1963, founded Custom Skins, Inc., a San Angelo sheepskin tannery, in 1969, and in the 1980s expanded into Colorado and California, becoming one of the largest individual sheep and wool producers in the United States. Cole Trucking ran a dedicated fleet between Texas and California.

In 1989, expecting the livestock market to peak, the Coles sold all their livestock and refocused on Texas, buying about 40,000 more acres between 1989 and 1992. In 2008, they sold a 9,000-acre ranch in Sutton and Schleicher counties. The Crockett County Soil and Water Conservation District recognized Bill Cole for more than 50 years of brush management, wildlife management, and erosion control.

“U” Ranch and VJ Ranch. George H. McEntire Sr. married Elliott in 1906, and shortly afterward the couple moved to the “U” Ranch headquarters. He managed the ranch for 55 years, at first in partnership with his father as McEntire & Son. After his death in January 1962, his son and daughter each inherited 16,233 acres. George H. McEntire Jr. kept operating under the “U” Ranch name, while Virginia McEntire Wilkinson and her son, Jack Wilkinson Jr., ran her half as the VJ Ranch.

==== Glass Ranch ====
The Glass Ranch, homesteaded by James Jefferson Lafayott Glass in 1889, grew to more than 32,000 acres in Sterling and Glasscock counties. It was recognized by the Texas Department of Agriculture's Family Land Heritage Program in 1990.

=== County established and growth ===
The county was established and organized in 1891 from Tom Green County. A competition developed between Sterling City and Cummins for the county seat. Sterling City won, and most of the Cummins population moved to Sterling City by the end of the year. Cummins became a ghost town. County voters in 1898 elected to make Sterling a dry county, prohibiting the sale of alcohol within its boundaries. Sheep ranching was introduced to the area in about 1890. Cotton was first planted in 1889. Sterling City opened its first cotton gin in 1895, with others established later. By 1900, 136 acres (0.55 km^{2}) were planted in cotton, and by 1910, production of the fiber had expanded to 1,626 acres (6.58 km^{2}). Eventually, it became more evident that county lands were most suitable for grazing. The cotton gins eventually failed; by 1920, only 650 acres (2.6 km^{2}) in Sterling County were planted in cotton. Ranching continued to expand in the county. Sterling County experienced a brief boom when the number of farms and ranches in the area increased from 131 in 1920 to 176 by 1925.

In 1914, Boy Scout State Encampment was hosted by Colonel W.R. McEntire and George McEntire, Sr, on the "U" Ranch.

The county's economy declined during the Great Depression of the 1930s. Oil discovered in Sterling County in 1947 helped to bail out the area's declining economy. By the beginning of 1991, 286,548,000 barrels (45,557,500 m^{3}) of crude had been extracted from within the county.

== Geography ==
According to the U.S. Census Bureau, the county has a total area of 924 square miles (2,390 km^{2}), of which 923 square miles (2,390 km^{2}) is land and 0.1 square miles (0.26 km^{2}) (0.01%) is covered by water.

=== Major highways ===
- U.S. Highway 87
- State Highway 158
- State Highway 163

=== Adjacent counties ===
- Mitchell County (north)
- Coke County (east)
- Tom Green County (southeast and south)
- Reagan County (southwest)
- Glasscock County (west)
- Howard County (northwest)

== Demographics ==
Historical population
Census	Pop.	Note	%±
1900	1,127		—
1910	1,493		32.5%
1920	1,053		−29.5%
1930	1,431		35.9%
1940	1,404		−1.9%
1950	1,282		−8.7%
1960	1,177		−8.2%
1970	1,056		−10.3%
1980	1,206		14.2%
1990	1,438		19.2%
2000	1,393		−3.1%
2010	1,143		−17.9%
2020	1,372		20.0%
2025 (est.)	1,349	▼	−1.7%
U.S. Decennial Census; 1850–2010 2010 2020

=== Racial and ethnic composition ===
Sterling County, Texas – Racial and ethnic composition Note: the US Census treats Hispanic/Latino as an ethnic category. This table excludes Latinos from the racial categories and assigns them to a separate category. Hispanics/Latinos may be of any race.
Race / Ethnicity (NH = Non-Hispanic)	Pop 1980	Pop 1990	Pop 2000	Pop 2010	Pop 2020	% 1980	% 1990	% 2000	% 2010	% 2020
White alone (NH)	918	1,067	955	733	867	76.12%	74.20%	68.56%	64.13%	63.19%
Black or African American alone (NH)	5	0	1	13	3	0.41%	0.00%	0.07%	1.14%	0.22%
Native American or Alaska Native alone (NH)	3	4	3	13	4	0.25%	0.28%	0.22%	1.14%	0.29%
Asian alone (NH)	0	0	0	0	1	0.00%	0.00%	0.00%	0.00%	0.07%
Native Hawaiian or Pacific Islander alone (NH)	x	x	1	0	2	x	x	0.07%	0.00%	0.15%
Other race alone (NH)	1	1	0	2	2	0.08%	0.07%	0.00%	0.17%	0.15%
Mixed race or Multiracial (NH)	x	x	1	17	44	x	x	0.07%	1.49%	3.21%
Hispanic or Latino (any race)	279	366	432	365	449	23.13%	25.45%	31.01%	31.93%	32.73%
Total	1,206	1,438	1,393	1,143	1,372	100.00%	100.00%	100.00%	100.00%	100.00%

=== 2020 census ===
As of the 2020 census, the county had a population of 1,372. The median age was 40.1 years. 26.0% of residents were under the age of 18 and 19.5% of residents were 65 years of age or older. For every 100 females there were 105.1 males, and for every 100 females age 18 and over there were 102.2 males.

The racial makeup of the county was 77.6% White, 0.2% Black or African American, 0.4% American Indian and Alaska Native, 0.1% Asian, 0.1% Native Hawaiian and Pacific Islander, 8.7% from some other race, and 12.8% from two or more races. Hispanic or Latino residents of any race comprised 32.7% of the population.

Less than 0.1% of residents lived in urban areas, while 100.0% lived in rural areas.

There were 494 households in the county, of which 38.5% had children under the age of 18 living in them. Of all households, 59.5% were married-couple households, 17.6% were households with a male householder and no spouse or partner present, and 18.6% were households with a female householder and no spouse or partner present. About 16.4% of all households were made up of individuals and 9.0% had someone living alone who was 65 years of age or older.

There were 579 housing units, of which 14.7% were vacant. Among occupied housing units, 73.7% were owner-occupied and 26.3% were renter-occupied. The homeowner vacancy rate was 0.3% and the rental vacancy rate was 7.2%.

=== 2000 census ===
As of the 2000 census, 1,393 people, 513 households, and 385 families resided in the county. The population density was 2 people per square mile (0.77 people/km^{2}). The 633 housing units averaged 1 units per square mile (0.39 units/km^{2}). The racial makeup of the county was 62.1% White, 1.1% Black, 2.5% from other races, and 34.5% of the population was Hispanic or Latino of any race.

Of the 513 households, 36.80% had children under the age of 18 living with them, 64.10% were married couples living together, 7.00% had a female householder with no husband present, and 24.80% were not families. About 23% of all households were made up of individuals, and 11.30% had someone living alone who was 65 years of age or older. The average household size was 2.67 and the average family size was 3.15.

In the county, the population was distributed as 28.70% under the age of 18, 6.10% from 18 to 24, 29.70% from 25 to 44, 20.80% from 45 to 64, and 14.60% who were 65 years of age or older. The median age was 38 years. For every 100 females, there were 96.50 males. For every 100 females age 18 and over, there were 95.90 males.

The median income for a household in the county was $35,129, and for a family was $37,813. Males had a median income of $28,173 versus $19,615 for females. The per capita income for the county was $16,972. About 13.90% of families and 16.80% of the population were below the poverty line, including 23.30% of those under age 18 and 15.90% of those age 65 or over.

== Communities ==
- Broome
- Sterling City (county seat)

== Politics ==
United States presidential election results for Sterling County, Texas
Year	Republican		Democratic		Third party(ies)	
Year	No.	%	No.	%	No.	%
1912	4	2.22%	165	91.67%	11	6.11%
1916	6	2.83%	205	96.70%	1	0.47%
1920	17	9.14%	152	81.72%	17	9.14%
1924	25	9.29%	243	90.33%	1	0.37%
1928	122	42.21%	167	57.79%	0	0.00%
1932	13	3.54%	354	96.46%	0	0.00%
1936	14	3.52%	384	96.48%	0	0.00%
1940	16	3.63%	425	96.37%	0	0.00%
1944	18	5.03%	330	92.18%	10	2.79%
1948	17	6.34%	244	91.04%	7	2.61%
1952	277	63.68%	158	36.32%	0	0.00%
1956	223	59.79%	150	40.21%	0	0.00%
1960	182	48.53%	193	51.47%	0	0.00%
1964	140	36.46%	243	63.28%	1	0.26%
1968	170	45.33%	151	40.27%	54	14.40%
1972	286	74.67%	94	24.54%	3	0.78%
1976	202	53.02%	174	45.67%	5	1.31%
1980	364	62.12%	218	37.20%	4	0.68%
1984	577	81.27%	129	18.17%	4	0.56%
1988	464	70.73%	188	28.66%	4	0.61%
1992	322	50.79%	127	20.03%	185	29.18%
1996	394	58.89%	186	27.80%	89	13.30%
2000	520	78.91%	132	20.03%	7	1.06%
2004	544	88.46%	71	11.54%	0	0.00%
2008	520	84.01%	97	15.67%	2	0.32%
2012	459	92.91%	31	6.28%	4	0.81%
2016	549	86.73%	70	11.06%	14	2.21%
2020	584	91.39%	51	7.98%	4	0.63%
2024	583	92.69%	43	6.84%	3	0.48%

United States Senate election results for Sterling County, Texas1
Year	Republican		Democratic		Third party(ies)	
Year	No.	%	No.	%	No.	%
2024	553	88.62%	56	8.97%	15	2.40%

United States Senate election results for Sterling County, Texas2
Year	Republican		Democratic		Third party(ies)	
Year	No.	%	No.	%	No.	%
2020	567	91.30%	47	7.57%	7	1.13%

Texas Gubernatorial election results for Sterling County
Year	Republican		Democratic		Third party(ies)	
Year	No.	%	No.	%	No.	%
2022	423	94.42%	20	4.46%	5	1.12%

== Education ==
All parts of the county are in the Sterling City Independent School District. Sterling City High School is the district's comprehensive high school.

All of Sterling County is in the service area of Howard County Junior College District.

== See also ==
- Dry counties
- National Register of Historic Places listings in Sterling County, Texas
- Recorded Texas Historic Landmarks in Sterling County
