= Broom (surname) =

Broom is a surname. Notable people with the surname include:

- Christina Broom (1862–1939), British photographer
- Jacob Broom (1752–1810), American businessman and politician
- Jacob Broom (congressman) (1808–1864), United States Representative from Pennsylvania
- James M. Broom (1776–1850), American lawyer and politician
- Leonard Broom (1911–2009), American sociologist
- Mark Broom (born 1971), British techno musician and DJ
- Neil Broom (born 1983), New Zealand cricketer
- Robert Broom (1866–1951), British-South African physician and paleontologist
- Romell Broom (1956–2020), American murderer
- Ron Broom (1925–2016), New Zealand cricketer
- Vernon H. Broom (1924–1989), justice of the Supreme Court of Mississippi
- William Broom (1895–1971), English footballer

== See also ==
- Broome (name)
- Broomfield (surname)
- Broomhall (surname)
