= Thomas Brome =

English monk

Thomas Brome (died 1380) was an English Carmelite friar, provincial of his order from 1362.

== Life ==
Brome was brought up in the monastery of his order in London, whence he proceeded to Oxford and attained the degree of master, and also, as it seems, of doctor in divinity. There he seems to have distinguished himself as a preacher. Returning to London, he was made prior of his house, and at a general chapter of the order, held at Cambridge in 1362, was appointed its provincial in England.

In 1365 Brome was in Avignon on business, with Thomas Maldon. He resigned his post in 1379, and died in his monastery a year later.

== Writings ==
Bale (Script. Brit. Cat. vi. 61, p. 486) enumerates his works as follows:

- Lectura Theologiæ
- Encomium Scripturæ Sacræ
- an exposition in Paulum ad Romanes (also on the preface by St. Jerome to that epistle)
- Sermones de Tempore
- Quæstiones variæ

Another work mentioned by Tanner (Bibl. Brit. p. 130), and entitled Lectiones pro inceptione sua Oxonii MCCCLVIII (perhaps identical with the Encomium above referred to), is of value as giving the date of Brome's procession to the degree, apparently, of D.D. None of these productions are now known to exist.
