= William Broom =

English professional footballer who played as an inside forward

Personal information
- Date of birth: 26 February 1895
- Place of birth: Grimsby, England
- Date of death: 5 January 1971 (aged 75)
- Position: Inside forward

Senior career*
Years	Team	Apps	(Gls)
1912–1914	Brigg Town		
1914–1919	Box Company		
1919–1920	Grimsby Town	3	(2)
1920–1921	Charlton's		
1921–19??	Brigg Town		
- * Club domestic league appearances and goals

William Broom (26 February 1895 – 5 January 1971) was an English professional footballer who played as an inside forward.
