= John Broome =

John Broome may refer to:

- John Broome (politician) (1738–1810), New York politician
- John L. Broome (1824–1898), USMC officer
- Jack Broome (John Egerton Broome, 1901–1985), British Royal Navy officer
- John Broome (writer) (1913–1999), American writer-contributor to DC comics
- John Spoor Broome (1917–2009), American rancher, aviator and philanthropist
- John Broome (philosopher) (born 1947), British philosopher and economist at the University of Oxford
- Jack Broome (rugby league) (1930–2013), English rugby league footballer
- John Broome (developer) (1943–2023), British developer and operator for theme parks

== See also ==
- Johni Broome (born 2002), American basketball player
