= Ian Broome =

English cricketer

Ian Broome (born 6 May 1960) was an English cricketer. He was a right-handed batsman and a right-arm medium-fast bowler who played for Gloucestershire and Derbyshire in his first-class career.

Broome first represented Gloucestershire in the 1979 Second XI Championship, debuting against Kent in the JPL. He continued to play for the second team until 1982, when he moved to Derbyshire in 1983, he played in the Second XI and made his County Championship debut against Kent in 1984, making a tenacious 26 N.O in his first innings. Ian continued to play in 1985 without any opportunity in the 1st XI. He continued to put in solid performances in the Second XI for the 1985 season. Ian moved to Sussex County Cricket Club on a match to match contract in 1986 season and with the support of Coach Stuart Storey a playing contract was offered for the 1987 season. When Stuart was sacked as Coach the playing contract was not honored. Ian continued to play for Radcliffe in the Central Lancashire League and then returned to Melbourne, Australia where he continued to focus on Coaching at various levels.
