= Broome Tramway =

Industrial tramway in Western Australia

The Broome Tramway was an industrial tramway in Broome, Western Australia. A horse-drawn, 2 ft gauge, Tramway was originally completed in 1898 to convey goods from the new Jetty at Mangrove Point into the heart of the small community at Jap' Town. The work on the tramway was started in 1894 to carry Mother of Pearl Shell from Streeter & Male Jetties to the Goods Shed. The high demand for the shell ensured the success of the tramway and the progress of Broome.

In the new century this was converted to a more stable 3 ft 6in gauge and then to steam driven in 1910.

Latterly, in the 1950s the locomotives used were diesel powered, and the line was finally dismantled with the closure of the old jetty in 1966.
