= Brome, Suffolk =

Village in Suffolk, England

Coordinates: 52.345°N 1.133°E

Brome
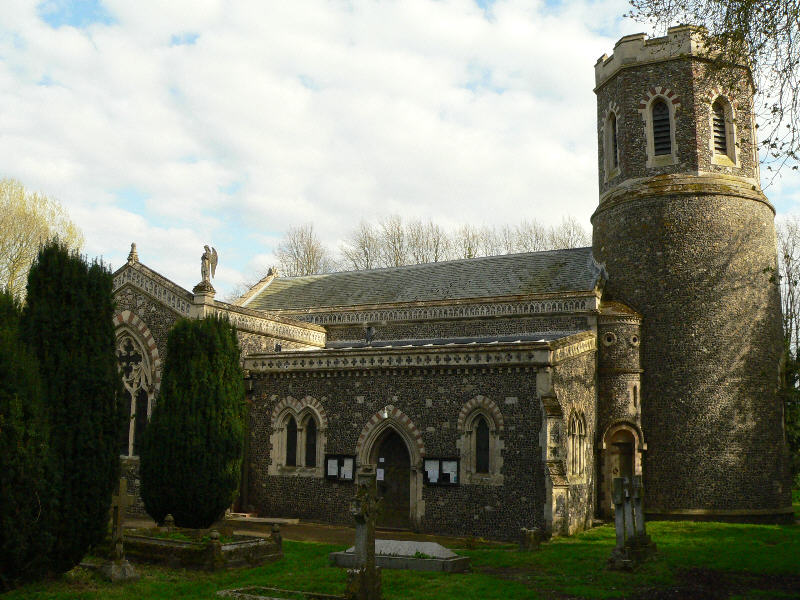
- The church of St Mary at Brome

- Location within Suffolk
- OS grid reference: TM135764
- Civil parish: Brome and Oakley
- District: Mid Suffolk
- Shire county: Suffolk
- Region: East
- Country: England
- Sovereign state: United Kingdom
- Post town: EYE
- Postcode district: IP23
- Dialling code: 01379
- UK Parliament: Central Suffolk and North Ipswich

Brome is a village and former civil parish in the Mid Suffolk district, in the north of the English county of Suffolk. It lies on the A140 Norwich to Ipswich road around 1 mile (1.6 km) northwest of Eye and 2 miles (3.2 km) southeast of Diss near the border with Norfolk. In 1961 the parish had a population of 230. The village is now in the parish of Brome and Oakley and has been combined with the village of Oakley for centuries but the civil parish was only combined on 1 April 1982.

The village church, dedicated to St Mary, is one of 38 existing round-tower churches in Suffolk. It is a Grade II* listed building with a medieval core dating from the 12th century. A moated site near the church is a scheduled monument dating from the same period.

== Sport ==
Mini Challenge UK and BTCC team Excelr8 Motorsport have a base in Brome. They have won the Mini Challenge three times and Tom Ingram won the 2022 BTCC Drivers' Championship driving for the team.

== Notable residents ==
The Catholic priest and martyr Henry Morse was born in the village in 1595. Morse was venerated and beatified in December 1929 and in 1970 was made one of the Forty Martyrs of England and Wales.

John Wilbye (1574–1638), the English madrigalist, was born in Brome. Amongst his works is the much performed madrigal: "Adew Sweet Amaryllis".
