= Sterling City Independent School District =

School district in Texas

Coordinates: 31°50′25.5″N 100°59′22.5″W

Sterling City Independent School District is a public school district based in Sterling City, Texas, United States.

The district includes all of Sterling County.

In 2009, the school district was rated "recognized" by the Texas Education Agency.

== Schools ==
- Sterling City High School (grades 9-12)
- Sterling City Junior High (grades 6-8)
- Sterling City Elementary (kindergarten-grade 5)

=== Athletics ===
Sterling City High School plays eleven-man football.

== See also ==
- List of school districts in Texas
