= Sterling City High School =

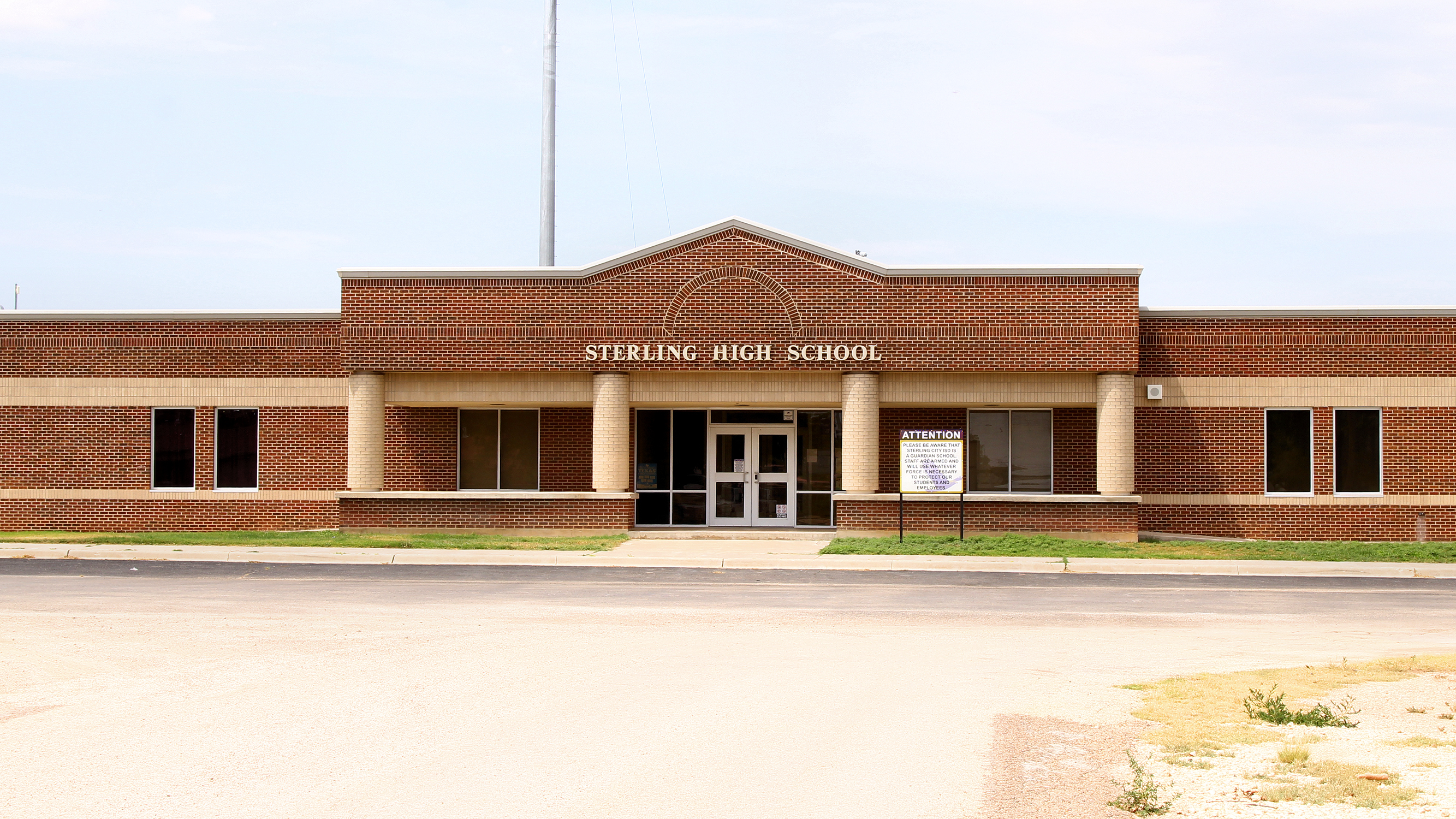

Location
- 700 7th Street; Sterling City, Texas 76951-0786; United States; 31.840159°N 100.988947°W

Information
- School type: Public high school
- School district: Sterling City Independent School District
- Principal: Ty Stevens
- Teaching staff: 29.68 (on an FTE basis)
- Grades: PK-12
- Enrollment: 347 (2023-2024)
- Student to teacher ratio: 11.69
- Colors: Purple & Gold
- Athletics conference: UIL Class A
- Mascot: Eagle
- Website: Sterling City High School

Sterling City High School is a public high school located in Sterling City, Texas (USA) and classified as a 1A school by the UIL. It is part of the Sterling City Independent School District that covers all of Sterling County. In 2015, the school was rated "Met Standard" by the Texas Education Agency.

The school district includes all of Sterling County.

== Athletics ==
The Sterling City Eagles compete in these sports -

- Basketball
- Cross Country
- 6-Man Football
- Golf
- Powerlifting
- Tennis
- Track and Field
- Volleyball

=== State Titles ===
- Boys Golf -
  - 1999(1A)
- Football
  - 2020 (1A Six-Man, Division I)
