= Brome and Oakley =

Civil parish in Suffolk, England

Coordinates: 52.35°N 1.15°E

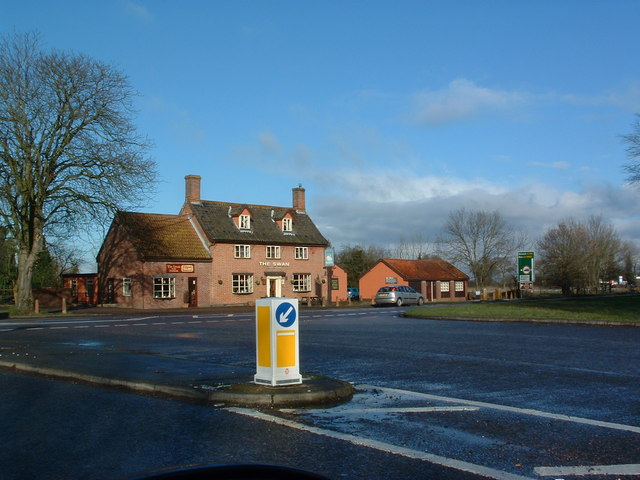
- The Swan public house at the A140 at Brome

- Location within Suffolk
- Population: 475 (2011)
- OS grid reference: TM147760
- Civil parish: Brome and Oakley
- District: Mid Suffolk
- Shire county: Suffolk
- Region: East
- Country: England
- Sovereign state: United Kingdom
- Post town: DISS
- Postcode district: IP21
- Post town: EYE
- Postcode district: IP23
- Dialling code: 01379
- UK Parliament: Central Suffolk and North Ipswich

Brome and Oakley is a civil parish in the Mid Suffolk district of the English county of Suffolk. The parish is in the north of the county, immediately south of the River Waveney which marks the border with Norfolk. It lies 1 mile (1.6 km) north of Eye and 3 miles (4.8 km) south-east of Diss.

The parish was formed in 1982 from the parishes of Brome and Oakley. The A140 Norwich to Ipswich road runs through the west of the parish and marks the parish boundary. Part of Eye airfield is also within the parish boundary.
