= Sterling City, Texas =

- City
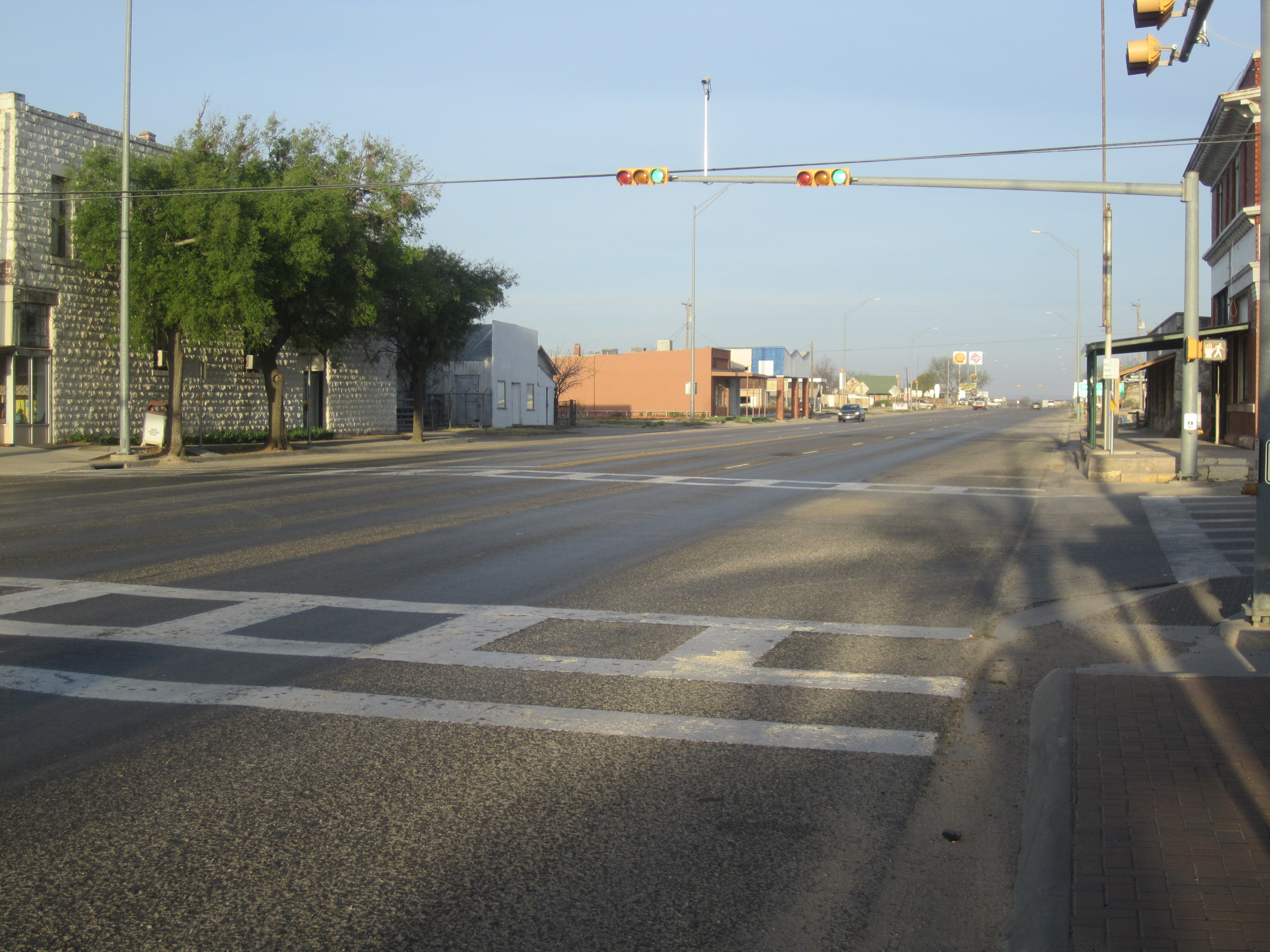
- U.S. Highway 87 as it passes through Sterling City, Texas
- Nickname: The Windmill City
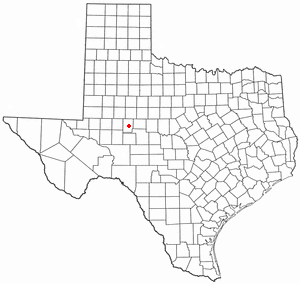
- Location of Sterling City, Texas

- Coordinates: 31°50′21″N 100°59′9″W
- Country: United States
- State: Texas
- County: Sterling

Area
  - Total: 0.98 sq mi (2.54 km^{2})
  - Land: 0.98 sq mi (2.54 km^{2})
  - Water: 0 sq mi (0.00 km^{2})
- Elevation: 2,287 ft (697 m)

Population (2020)
  - Total: 1,121
  - Density: 1,143.1/sq mi (441.34/km^{2})
- Time zone: UTC-6 (Central (CST))
  - Summer (DST): UTC-5 (CDT)
- ZIP code: 76951
- Area code: 325
- FIPS code: 48-70232
- GNIS feature ID: 1347899
- Website: sterlingcitytexas.com

Sterling City is a city in and the county seat of Sterling County, Texas, United States. Its population was 1,121 at the 2020 census.

== History ==
Sterling City was named for W.S. Sterling, a buffalo hunter and Indian fighter. Land for the new town was donated in January 1891 by R.C. Stewart, and was platted by H.B. Tarver in February. That same year, it was designated the seat of Sterling County. The town soon grew to 300 residents and had its own newspaper, a hotel, a post office, several other businesses, a school, and three churches.

Sterling City was a stop on the Santa Fe Railroad by 1910, but the service was eventually abandoned. The depot still exists as a tourist site.

During World War II, Sterling City's population decreased by 10%. When it was incorporated in August 1955, Sterling City had a population of some 800 and had added three more churches, a hospital, a bank, and a library.

On May 25, 1955, 15 United States Air Force personnel, flying in a B-36 bomber under the callsign Abbot 27, perished in a crash near Sterling City.

== Geography ==
Sterling City is located on the Edwards Plateau in west-central Texas along the North Concho River at 31°50′21″N 100°59′9″W (31.839066, –100.985871). It is accessed by U.S. Highway 87 and State Highways 158 and 163, and covers area of 0.98 sq mi (2.5 km^{2}), all land.

Windmills have been a feature of Sterling City since the early 20th century, when the town claimed to have more windmills per acre than any other place in the world, totaling some 300. Today, most of Sterling City's windmills are giant turbines in modern wind farms on a ridge approximately 20 miles northwest of the town and visible from U.S. Highway 87.

=== Climate ===
Climate data for Sterling City, Texas (1991–2020 normals, extremes 1963–2019)
Month	Jan	Feb	Mar	Apr	May	Jun	Jul	Aug	Sep	Oct	Nov	Dec	Year
Record high °F (°C)	87 (31)	94 (34)	98 (37)	102 (39)	109 (43)	112 (44)	109 (43)	108 (42)	106 (41)	104 (40)	93 (34)	86 (30)	112 (44)
Mean daily maximum °F (°C)	57.5 (14.2)	61.8 (16.6)	69.1 (20.6)	77.8 (25.4)	84.8 (29.3)	91.1 (32.8)	93.5 (34.2)	92.9 (33.8)	85.8 (29.9)	77.3 (25.2)	65.9 (18.8)	58.3 (14.6)	76.3 (24.6)
Daily mean °F (°C)	43.7 (6.5)	47.6 (8.7)	55.3 (12.9)	63.8 (17.7)	72.9 (22.7)	79.6 (26.4)	82.3 (27.9)	81.6 (27.6)	74.2 (23.4)	64.4 (18.0)	52.5 (11.4)	44.7 (7.1)	63.6 (17.6)
Mean daily minimum °F (°C)	29.9 (−1.2)	33.5 (0.8)	41.5 (5.3)	49.8 (9.9)	60.9 (16.1)	68.2 (20.1)	71.0 (21.7)	70.3 (21.3)	62.5 (16.9)	51.5 (10.8)	39.2 (4.0)	31.2 (−0.4)	50.8 (10.4)
Record low °F (°C)	1 (−17)	−13 (−25)	4 (−16)	20 (−7)	30 (−1)	45 (7)	47 (8)	50 (10)	32 (0)	23 (−5)	10 (−12)	−7 (−22)	−13 (−25)
Average precipitation inches (mm)	0.95 (24)	0.97 (25)	1.27 (32)	1.32 (34)	2.75 (70)	2.06 (52)	1.68 (43)	2.42 (61)	2.45 (62)	2.46 (62)	1.20 (30)	0.87 (22)	20.40 (518)
Average snowfall inches (cm)	0.1 (0.25)	0.4 (1.0)	0.0 (0.0)	0.0 (0.0)	0.0 (0.0)	0.0 (0.0)	0.0 (0.0)	0.0 (0.0)	0.0 (0.0)	0.0 (0.0)	0.5 (1.3)	0.5 (1.3)	1.5 (3.8)
Average precipitation days (≥ 0.01 in)	3.2	3.1	3.9	3.6	5.7	4.7	4.0	4.6	3.9	4.2	2.8	2.5	46.2
Average snowy days (≥ 0.1 in)	0.2	0.3	0.0	0.0	0.0	0.0	0.0	0.0	0.0	0.0	0.2	0.3	1.0
Source: NOAA

== Demographics ==
Historical population
Census	Pop.	Note	%±
1960	854		—
1970	780		−8.7%
1980	915		17.3%
1990	1,096		19.8%
2000	1,081		−1.4%
2010	888		−17.9%
2020	1,121		26.2%
U.S. Decennial Census

=== 2020 census ===
As of the 2020 census, 1,121 people lived in Sterling City, including 291 families.

The median age was 38.5 years. 27.2% of residents were under the age of 18 and 18.0% of residents were 65 years of age or older. For every 100 females there were 108.0 males, and for every 100 females age 18 and over there were 104.5 males age 18 and over.

0.0% of residents lived in urban areas, while 100.0% lived in rural areas.

There were 393 households in Sterling City, of which 39.7% had children under the age of 18 living in them. Of all households, 56.2% were married-couple households, 20.1% were households with a male householder and no spouse or partner present, and 18.6% were households with a female householder and no spouse or partner present. About 17.1% of all households were made up of individuals and 8.4% had someone living alone who was 65 years of age or older.

There were 435 housing units, of which 9.7% were vacant. The homeowner vacancy rate was 0.4% and the rental vacancy rate was 8.7%.

Racial composition as of the 2020 census
Race	Number	Percent
White	846	75.5%
Black or African American	3	0.3%
American Indian and Alaska Native	5	0.4%
Asian	1	0.1%
Native Hawaiian and Other Pacific Islander	2	0.2%
Some other race	107	9.5%
Two or more races	157	14.0%
Hispanic or Latino (of any race)	422	37.6%

=== 2000 census ===
As of the census of 2000, 1,081 people, 393 households, and 297 families resided in the city. The population density was 1,105.9 people/sq mi (425.9/km^{2}). The 467 housing units averaged 477.7/sq mi (184.0/km^{2}). The racial makeup of the city was 82.05% White, 0.09% African American, 0.37% Native American, 0.09% Pacific Islander, 14.80% from other races, and 2.59% from two or more races. Hispanics or Latinos of any race were 33.30% of the population.

Of the 393 households, 36.9% had children under 18 living with them, 62.8% were married couples living together, 8.1% had a female householder with no husband present, and 24.4% were not families. About 23.4% of all households were made up of individuals, and 12.7% had someone living alone who was 65 or older. The average household size was 2.69, and the average family size was 3.18.

In the city, the age distribution was 29.6% under 18, 5.5% from 18 to 24, 29.2% from 25 to 44, 20.0% from 45 to 64, and 15.7% who were 65 or older. The median age was 38 years. For every 100 females, there were 94.4 males. For every 100 females age 18 and over, there were 90.7 males.

The median income for a household in the city was $36,359, and for a family was $38,958. Males had a median income of $32,500 versus $18,654 for females. The per capita income for the city was $14,955. About 14.3% of families and 17.7% of the population were below the poverty line, including 22.3% of those under age 18 and 19.3% of those age 65 or over.

== Education ==
The city of Sterling City is served by the Sterling City Independent School District, and is home to the Sterling City High School Eagles.

All of Sterling County is in the service area of Howard County Junior College District.

== Gallery ==
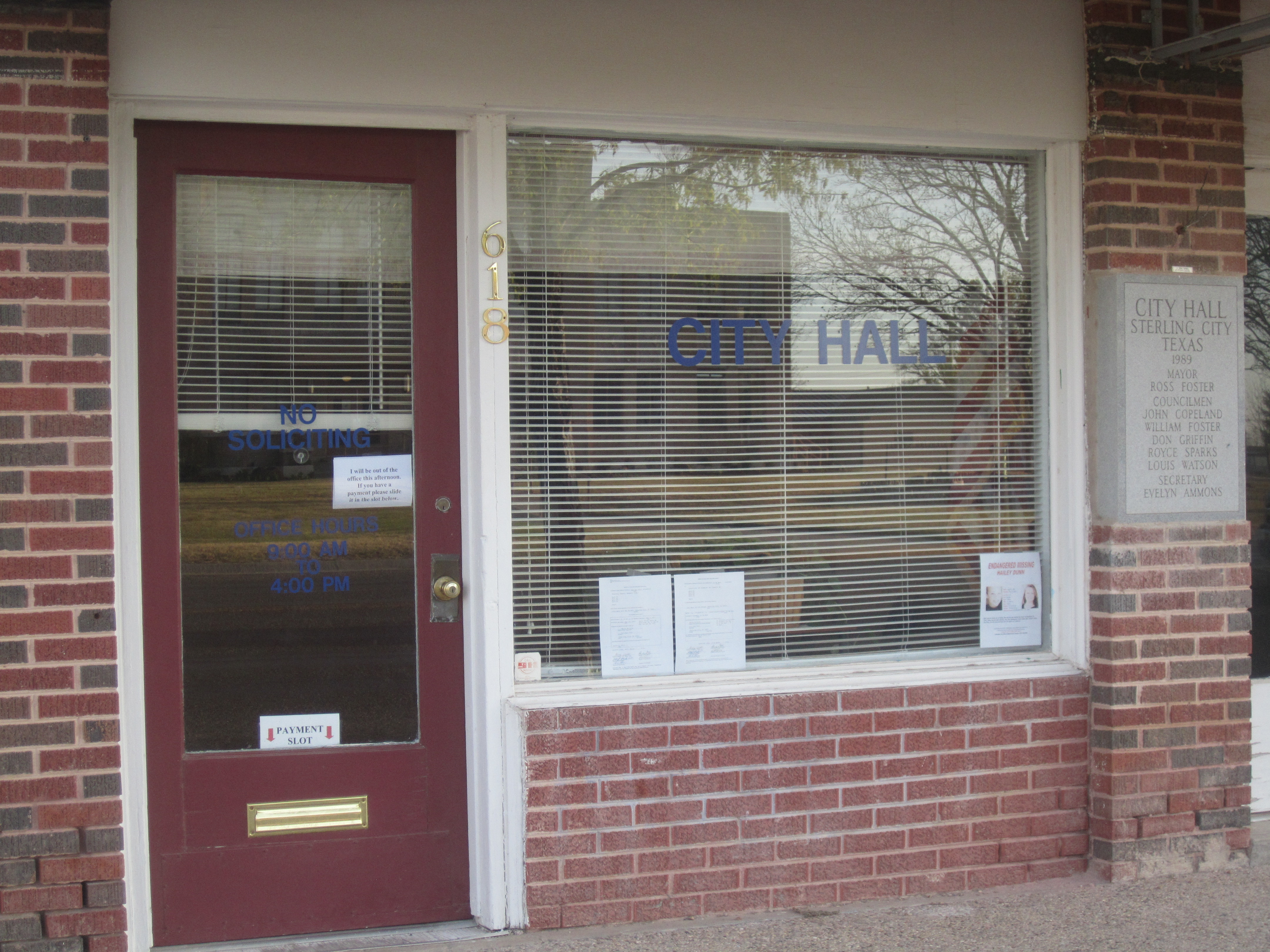
City Hall is located across from the courthouse in Sterling City.

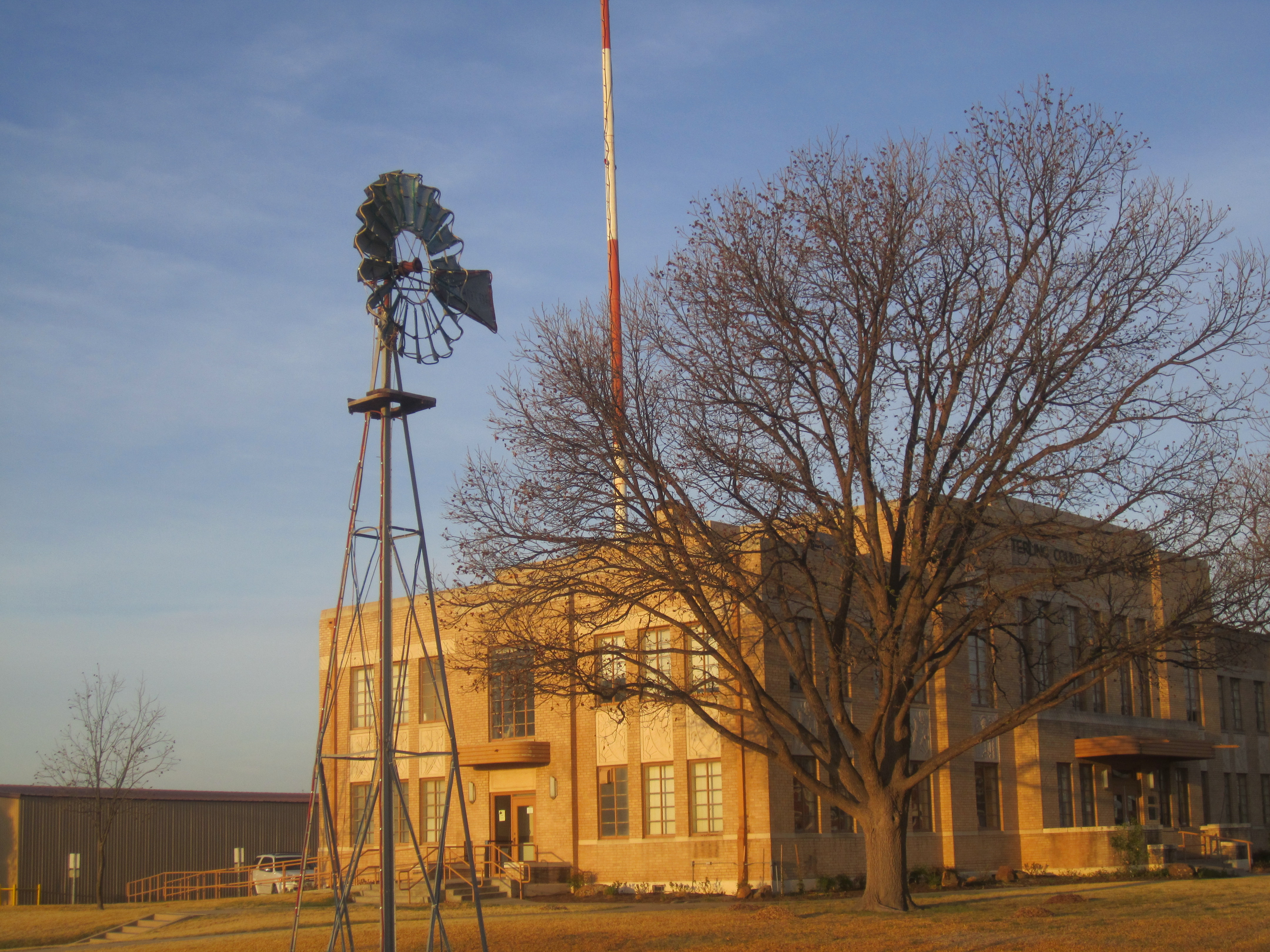
A windmill on the courthouse grounds in Sterling City

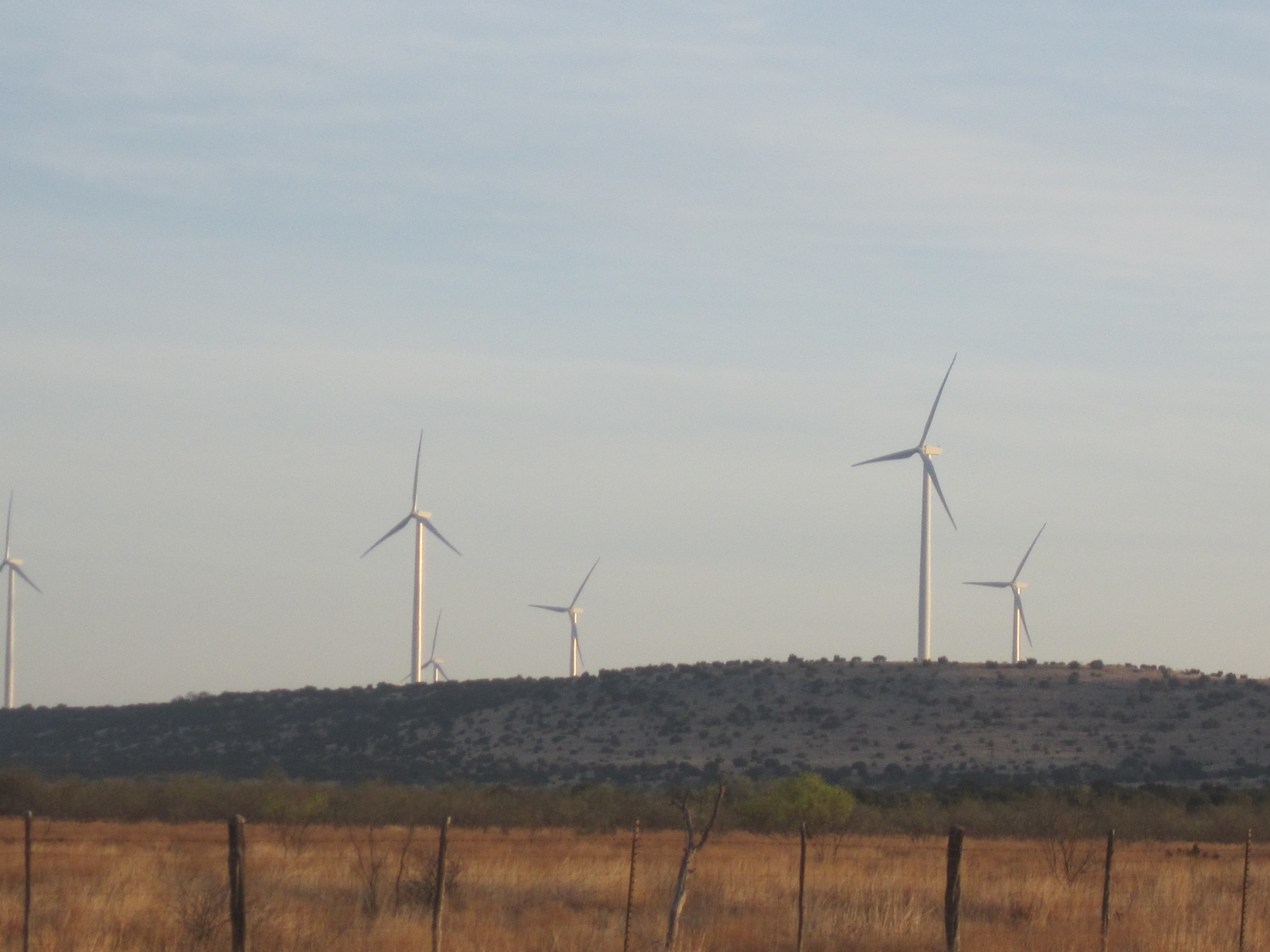
Wind turbines off U.S. Highway 87 south of Sterling City

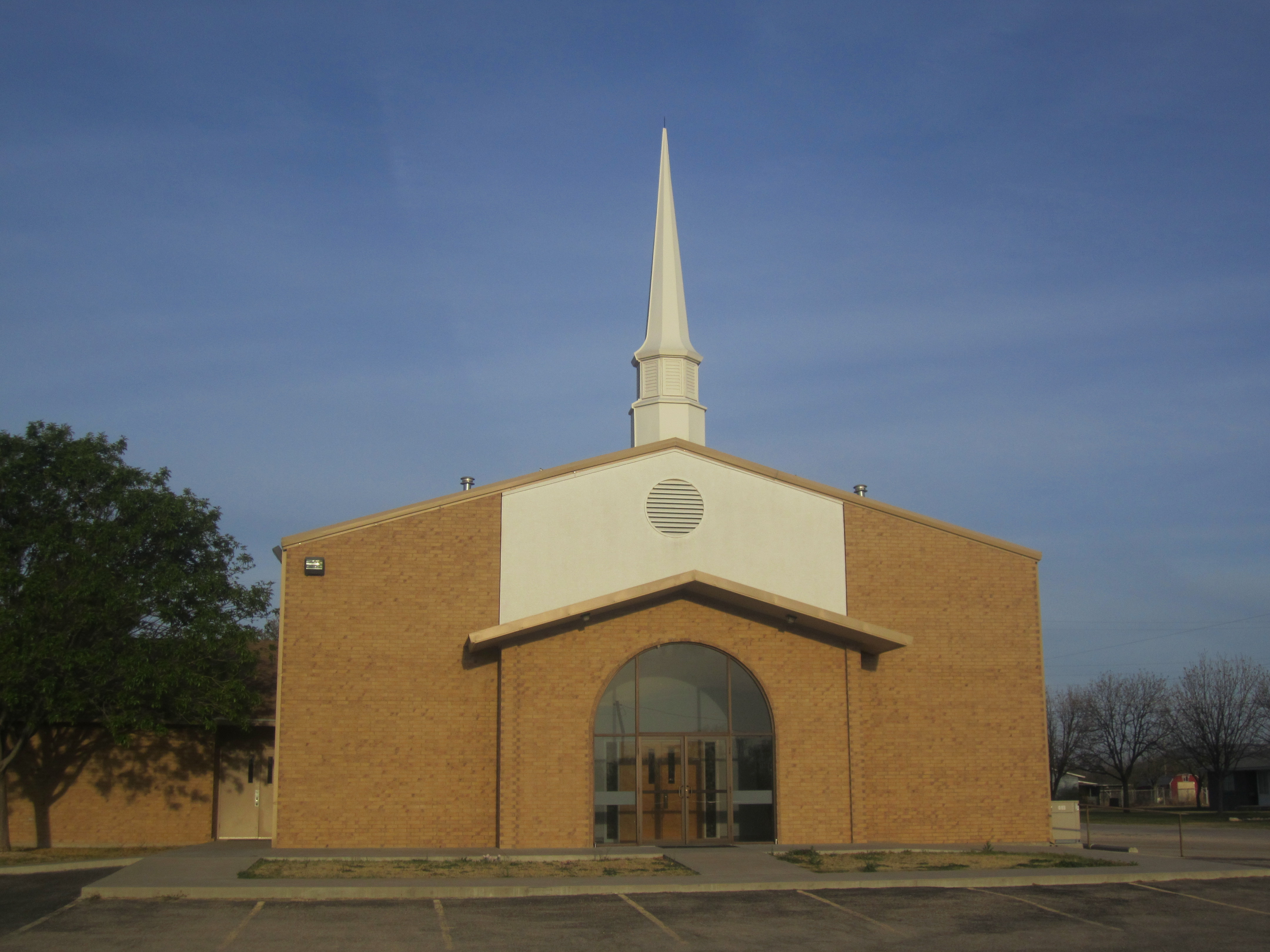
First Baptist Church at 401 Water Street in Sterling City, pastor, Jason McGuire (2013)
