= Tramway (industrial) =

Lightly engineered small-scale industrial railways

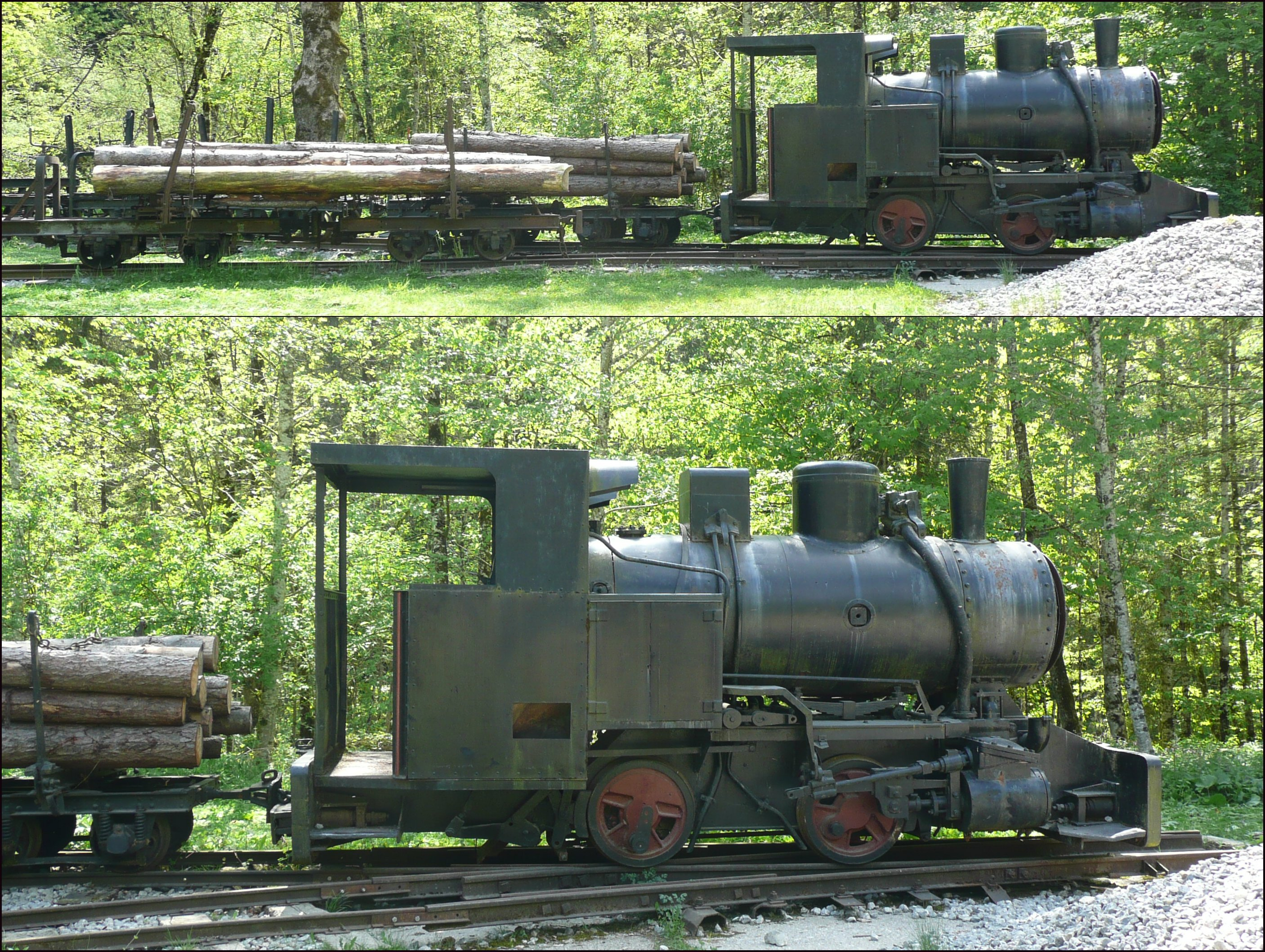
A replica tramway in Austria, showing one of the most common uses, transporting logs.

Tramways are lightly laid industrial railways, often not intended to be permanent. Originally, rolling stock could be pushed by humans, pulled by animals (especially horses and mules), cable-hauled by a stationary engine, or pulled by small, light locomotives. Tramways can exist in many forms; sometimes simply tracks temporarily placed on the ground to transport materials around a factory, mine or quarry. Many use narrow-gauge railway technology, but because tramway infrastructure is not intended to support the weight of vehicles used on railways of wider track gauge, the infrastructure can be built using less substantial materials, enabling considerable cost savings.

The term "tramway" is not used in North America, but is commonly used in the United Kingdom and elsewhere where British railway terminology and practices influenced management practices, terminologies and railway cultures, such as Australia, New Zealand, and those parts of Asia, Africa and South America that consulted with British engineers when undergoing modernization. In New Zealand, they are commonly known as "bush tramways" and are often not intended to be permanent. In Australia the term was widely used in connection with logging, no longer extant. Today in the state of Queensland, however, there remain several thousand kilometres of sugar-cane tramways.

Passengers do not generally travel aboard tramways, although employees sometimes use them, either officially or unofficially.

== History ==
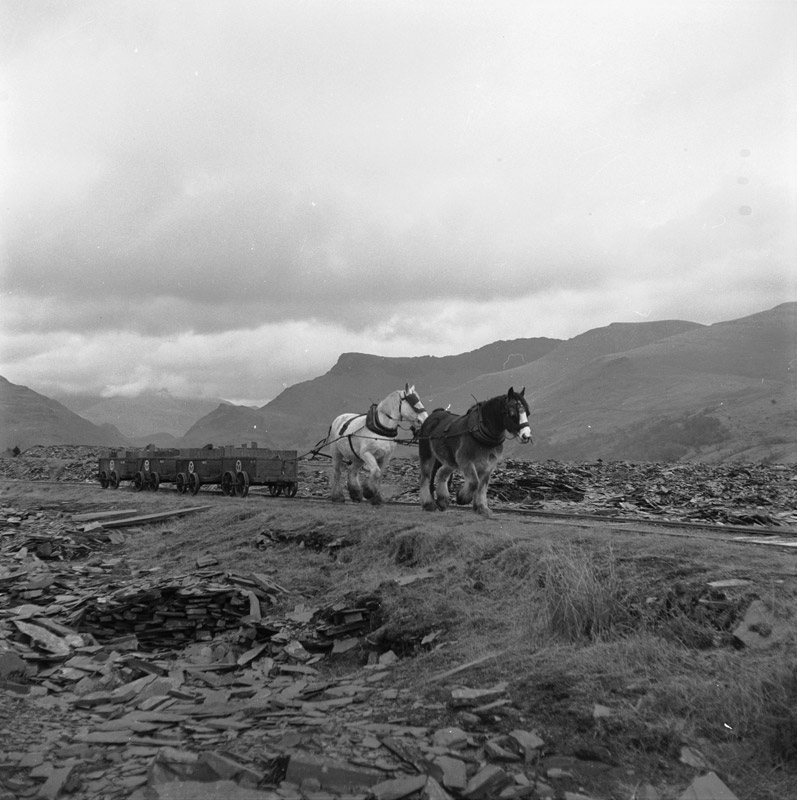
A horse-drawn train carrying slate at Dyffryn Nantlle in Wales, 1959.

The term was originally applied to wagons running on primitive tracks in mediaeval Great Britain and Europe. The name seems to date from about 1517 and to be derived from an English dialect word for the shaft of a wheelbarrow—in turn from Low German traam, meaning a beam.

The tracks themselves were sometimes known as gangways, (Note: As, for instance Little Eaton Gangway.) dating from before the 12th century, being usually simply planks laid upon the ground literally "going road". In south Wales and Somerset the term dramway is also used, with minecarts being called drams.

An alternative term, "wagonway" (and wainway or waggonway), originally consisted of horses, equipment and tracks used for hauling wagons.

Usually the wheels would be guided along grooves. In time, to combat wear, the timber would be reinforced with an iron strip covering. This developed to use L-shaped steel plates, the track then being known as a plateway.

An alternative appeared in 1789, the so-called "edge-rail", which allowed wagons to be guided by having the wheels flanged instead of running, flangeless, in grooves. Since these rails were raised above the ground they were less likely to be blocked by debris, but they obstructed other traffic, and the wagons could not be used beyond the limits of the rails – whereas plateways had the advantage that trucks with unflanged wheels could be wheeled freely on wharves and in factories. Edge rails were the forerunners of the modern railway track.

These early lines were built to transport minerals from quarries and mines to canal wharves. From about 1830, more extensive trunk railways appeared, becoming faster, heavier and more sophisticated and, for safety reasons, the requirements placed on them by Parliament became more and more stringent. See rail tracks.

These restrictions were excessive for the small mineral lines and it became possible in the United Kingdom for them to be categorised as light railways subject to certain provisos laid down by the Light Railways Act 1896.

Meanwhile, in the United Kingdom the term tramway became the term for passenger vehicles (a tram) that ran on tracks in the public highway, sharing with other road users. Initially horse-drawn, they were developed to use electric power from an overhead line. A development of the tramway in the United Kingdom was the trolleybus, which dispensed with tracks but drew electricity from overhead wires.

Between 2001 and 2020, two trams built to carry automotive parts (the "CarGoTram") operated in Dresden, Germany between a logistics centre and the Volkswagen factory.

== See also ==
- Barlow rail
- British narrow gauge railways
- Broome Tramway
- Decauville
- Feldbahn
- Forest railway
- Iron rails
- Mine railway
- Narrow-gauge railways in Australia
- Plateway
- Rail profile
- Tramway track
- List of tramways in Queensland
