= Loreto College =

Loreto College, Loreto Convent, Loreto School and similar may refer to a number of Roman Catholic schools throughout the world associated with the Sisters of Loreto.

== Australia ==
- Loreto College Coorparoo, Queensland
- Loreto College, Marryatville, South Australia
- Loreto College, Victoria, in Ballarat
- Loreto Convent, Claremont, Western Australia
- Loreto Kirribilli, New South Wales
- Loreto Mandeville Hall, Victoria
- Loreto Nedlands, Western Australia
- Loreto Normanhurst, New South Wales

== India ==
- Loreto College, Kolkata
- Loreto Convent, Asansol
- Loreto Convent, Darjeeling
- Loreto Convent Lucknow
- Loreto Convent School, Delhi
- Loreto Convent, Tara Hall, Shimla
- Loreto Schools, Kolkata
- St. Agnes' Loreto Day School, Lucknow

== Ireland ==
- Loreto Abbey, Dalkey
- Loreto College, Coleraine
- Loreto College, Foxrock
- Loreto College, Mullingar
- Loreto College, Swords,
- Loreto Convent Secondary School, Letterkenny
- Loreto Secondary School, Kilkenny
- Loreto Secondary School, Navan
- Loreto College, Crumlin
- Loreto College, St Stephen's Green
- Loreto Secondary School, Bray; see Sisters of Loreto § Ireland

== Kenya ==
- Loreto High School, Limuru
- Loreto Convent Msongari

== Mauritius ==
- Loreto College of Rose-Hill, Mauritius
- Loreto College Saint Pierre, Mauritius
- Loreto College of Port Louis Mauritius
- Loreto College of Mahebourg Mauritius
- Loreto college of Curepipe Mauritius
- Loreto College of Qautre BornesMauritius
- Loreto College of Bambous Virieux Mauritius

== United Kingdom ==
=== England ===
- Loreto College, Manchester
- Loreto College, St Albans
- Loreto Grammar School, Altrincham
- Loreto High School, Chorlton, Manchester

=== Northern Ireland ===
- Loreto College, Coleraine, County Londonderry
- Loreto Grammar School, Omagh, County Tyrone

== See also ==
- Loretto (disambiguation)
