= Loreto =

Loreto is Italian for laurel-wood. A town in Italy named Loreto holds an important Christian shrine, which led to the spread of the name to many countries. It may refer to:

== Places ==
=== Argentina ===
- Loreto, Santiago del Estero
- Loreto, Misiones

=== Bolivia ===
- Loreto, Beni

=== Brazil ===
- Loreto, Maranhão

=== Ecuador ===
- Loreto Canton, in the province of Orellana

=== Italy ===
- Loreto, Marche, home of the Basilica della Santa Casa after which the other shrines are named
- Loreto Aprutino, Pescara

=== Mexico ===
- Loreto, Baja California Sur
- Loreto Municipality, Baja California Sur
- Loreto, Zacatecas

=== Paraguay ===
- Loreto, Concepción department

=== Peru ===
- Department of Loreto

=== Philippines ===
- Loreto, Agusan del Sur
- Loreto, Dinagat Islands

=== Switzerland ===
- Loreto, Switzerland, a district of Lugano

== Other ==
- Loreto (meteorite), found in 1896 in Baja California Sur, Mexico
- Loreto (Milan Metro), a subway station on the Line 1 of Milan Metro
- Nicolás del Campo (full name "Nicolás Francisco Cristóbal del Campo, Marquis of Loreto", 1725–1803), sometimes referred to as "Viceroy Loreto"

== People ==
- Loreto Carbonell (1933–2017), Filipino basketball player
- Loreto Cucchiarelli (1943–2025), Italian rugby union player and coach
- Loreto Di Franco (1578–1638), Roman Catholic prelate
- Loreto Garza (born 1962), former American boxer and light welterweight world champion
- Loreto Tuñón Ginés (born 2007), Spanish gymnast
- Loreto Silva (born 1964), Chilean deputy minister

== See also ==
- Loreta (disambiguation)
- Loreto College (disambiguation), list of schools named Loreto College or Loreto School
- Loreto Department
- Loreto Municipality (disambiguation)
- Loretto (disambiguation)
- Litany of Loreto
- Notre Dame de Lorette, the name of a ridge, basilica, and French national cemetery northwest of Arras at the village of Ablain-Saint-Nazaire
- Sisters of Loreto, a women's Catholic religious order founded by an Englishwoman, Mary Ward, in 1609
- Basilica della Santa Casa, Holy House of Loreto
