= Loreto Schools, Kolkata =

Group of all-girl Roman Catholic schools

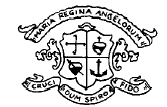
Crest of the Loreto Schools

Loreto Schools are a group of all-girl Roman Catholic schools throughout the world associated with the Sisters of Loreto, founded by the English recusant nun Mary Ward and are run by the Loreto Educational Society (Loreto sisters), which in India runs 17 schools and 2 colleges.

In Ireland in the 1850s the schools were founded to combat the growing Protestant influence in English education in then British-controlled Ireland and ensure Catholic education for girls. It spread to India and Australia in the 1870s.

== Loreto Schools in India ==
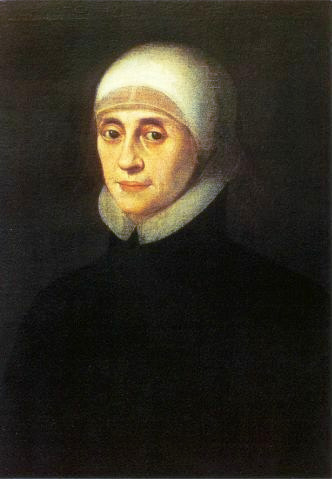
Venerable Mary Ward, I.B.V.M. (1585–1645), who founded the order, Sisters of Loreto in 1609

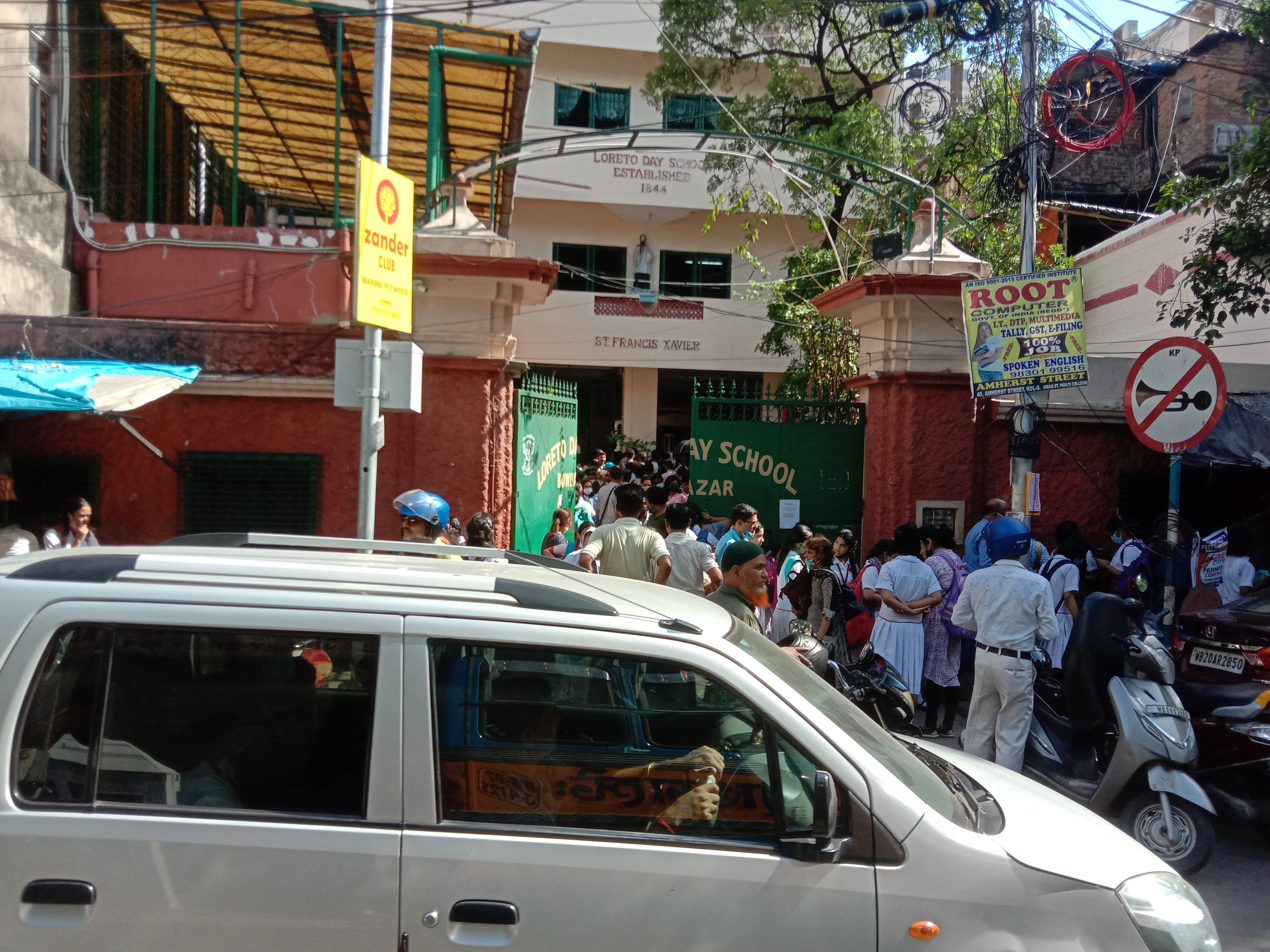
Loreto Day School, at B.B. Ganguly Street, Bowbazar, June 2022

In Kolkata, Loreto schools are located at 7 Middleton Row, Sealdah (Loreto House, the largest of the group), as well as Entally, Elliot Road, Bowbazar, and Dharmatala.

There are also Loreto schools in other cities across India including Darjeeling, Delhi, and Asansol. Lucknow has two. The schools engage in charitable activities and on academic and all-round development of the students.

- Loreto Convent, Asansol
- Loreto Convent Doranda, Ranchi
- Loreto Convent Lucknow, established 1872
- St. Agnes' Loreto Day School, Lucknow
- Loreto Convent, Tara Hall, Shimla, established 1892
- Loreto Convent, Darjeeling, established 1846
- Loreto Convent, Shillong
- Loreto Convent, Delhi

== Notable alumni ==
- Jyoti Basu
- Manjulika

== See also ==
- List of Loreto Colleges and schools
- Education in Kolkata
