= Loretto =

Loretto may refer to:

== Places ==
=== Austria ===
- Loretto, Austria, a town in the district of Eisenstadt-Umgebung in Burgenland

=== Canada ===
- Loretto, Ontario

=== India ===
- Loretto, a village in Bantwal taluk, Karnataka state

=== Poland ===
- Loretto, Poland, a village in Masovian Voivodeship

=== United States ===
(by state)

- Loretto, Kentucky
- Loretto, Michigan
- Loretto, Minnesota
- Loretto, Nebraska
- Loretto, Pennsylvania
- Loretto, Tennessee
- Loretto, Virginia
- Loretto (Wytheville, Virginia)

==== Buildings and establishments ====
- Villa Loretto, Peekskill, New York
- Federal Correctional Institution, Loretto, Pennsylvania
- Our Lady of Loretto Roman Catholic Church and Cemetery, Honey Creek, Wisconsin

== Education ==
- Loretto Abbey Catholic Secondary School, North York, Toronto, Ontario
- Loretto Academy (Chicago)
- Loretto Academy (El Paso, Texas)
- Loretto Academy (Kansas City, Missouri)
- Loretto Academy (St. Louis, Missouri), listed on the NRHP in Missouri
- Loretto College, part of the University of St. Michael's College, Toronto, Ontario
- Loretto College School, Earlscourt, Toronto, Ontario
- Loretto High School, Sacramento, California
- Loretto School, Scotland
- Teikyo Loretto Heights University, Denver, Colorado

== Other uses ==
- Sisters of Loretto, American Catholic religious institute
- Loretto Chapel, Santa Fe, New Mexico
- Loretto (artist), London street artist

== See also ==
- Loreto (disambiguation)
- Sisters of Loreto, formally called the Institute of the Blessed Virgin Mary
