= Loretto Academy =

Loretto Academy may refer to:

- Loretto Academy (Kansas City, Missouri), listed on the NRHP in Missouri
- Loretto Academy (St. Louis, Missouri), listed on the NRHP in St. Louis, Missouri
- Loretto Academy (Chicago)
- Loretto Academy (El Paso, Texas)
- Loretto Academy in Santa Fe, New Mexico, merged with St. Michael's High School sometime after 1967

== See also ==
- Loretto (disambiguation), which includes other schools)
