= Loreta =

Loreta may refer to:

- Loreta, Wisconsin, an unincorporated community in the town of Bear Creek, Sauk County, Wisconsin, United States
- Loreta (Prague), a pilgrimage destination in Hradčany, a district of Prague, Czech Republic
- Loreta (actress), Iranian Armenian stage and film actress
- Loreta (given name), a feminine given name

== See also ==
- Loreto (disambiguation)
