= Loretan =

Loretan is a surname. Notable people with the surname include:

- Brigitte Albrecht-Loretan (born 1970), Swiss cross-country skier
- Erhard Loretan (1959–2011), Swiss mountain climber
- Pascal Loretan (born 1989), Swiss sport shooter
- Willy Loretan (1934–2026), Swiss politician

== See also ==
- Loreta (given name)
