= Loreto College, Manchester =

Loreto College

Location
- Chichester Road; Manchester, Greater Manchester, M15 5PB; 53°27′46″N 2°15′11″W

Information
- Type: Sixth form college
- Motto: Our History, Your Future
- Religious affiliation: Roman Catholic
- Established: 1851; 175 years ago
- Founder: Loreto Sisters
- Local authority: North West LSC (although in Manchester LEA)
- Department for Education URN: 130503 Tables
- Ofsted: Reports
- Principal: Michael Jaffrain
- Gender: Mixed
- Age: 16 to 18
- Colours: Blue and White
- Website: http://www.loreto.ac.uk

Loreto College is a Roman Catholic sixth form college in Hulme, Manchester, England, based on the educational philosophy of Mary Ward, a 16th-century nun, who founded the Institute of the Blessed Virgin Mary, the congregation of religious sisters who started the college in 1851.

== History ==
The school was a Roman Catholic female direct grant grammar school, known as Loreto Convent High School.

== Awards and achievements ==
- Loreto College was rated as "Outstanding" by Ofsted in 2007, 2010, and 2023.
- Loreto College has also achieved the AoC Beacon Schools Award for the 'Successful Delivery of Level 3 Qualifications'.
- The college has had 5 students gaining places on the Prime Minister's Global Fellowship programme. It achieved its first student in the inaugural year, 2008.
- Based on ALP's analysis between 2011 and 2013 (Advanced Level Performance) Loreto College has been placed in the top 1% of colleges nationally.
- Highest A-Level Results of any college in Manchester.
- Manchester Evening News named Loreto as one of "The Best in Britain".
- Ofsted recognises that the majority of students achieve Grades A & B at advanced level.

== Location ==
The school is on the western edge of Manchester, near the boundary with Trafford and the Church of St Mary, Hulme. It is accessed via Princess Road, the A5103.

The college campus was redeveloped from 2002 to 2014 when four buildings were constructed. The campus has two smaller buildings, the Chapel which is home to the Art and Design Department and a Sports Hall. Most of learning faculties are situated in the four main buildings on the campus.

St. Vincent's is the newest building on the campus, having opened on 2 December 2025.

- Ball Building - Theology, Modern Foreign Languages, Travel and Tourism, Biology, Chemistry, Physics, Applied Science, Core RE, and Pathways to Independence.
- St. Joseph's Building - Mathematics and Accounting.
- Ward Building - Criminology, Sociology, Health and Social Care and Psychology.
- Sports Hall - Physical Education.
- Ellis and Kennedy Building - Library, Graphics, 3D Design, Media Studies, Film Studies, Music, Music Technology, Dance, Drama, Performing Arts, English Language, English Literature, IT, and Computing.
- Chapel and Visual Arts Building - Art and Design and Textiles.
- St. Vincent's - Classical Civilization, Geography, History, Economics, Law, Politics, Business

== Admissions ==
Loreto College is an oversubscribed college and a priority system exists for applications. Approximately 52% of the students at Loreto College are Roman Catholic but the college is open to all faiths who share the same values of Excellence, Freedom, Internationality, Justice, Sincerity, Truth and Joy.

The hierarchy of priority is:

- Pupils from partnership Roman Catholic schools
- Catholic pupils from other Roman Catholic Schools.
- Roman Catholic pupils at Non-Religious Schools.
- Pupils from all other Schools.
- Pupils that have not met the application deadline

Looked-after children have the highest priority relative to their category.

The fifteen Roman Catholic partnership schools are as follows; Loreto High School, St Peter's RC High School, The Barlow RC High School, St Paul's RC High School, Our Lady's RC High School, St Matthew's RC High School, St Ambrose Barlow RC High School, Blessed Thomas Holford Catholic College, St Patrick's RC High School, St Monica's High School, St Damian's RC Science College, St Thomas More RC College, St Philip Howard Catholic Voluntary Academy, St Peter's RC High School, St Antony's RC School, and All Hallows RC High School, and St John Vianney RC School.

Prospective students must also meet GCSE entry requirements to study A Level or a combination of A Level and BTEC Level 3 Extended Certificate courses (Six passes at grade 4 or above with two from either English, Maths or Science. Of these passes, two should be at a grade 6). Alongside these entry requirements, some courses may require specific grades in certain GCSE subjects.

Students applying solely for BTEC courses have different entry requirements. For example, students that apply for a BTEC Level 3 Extended Diploma require either five GCSEs at grades 9-4 including English and Maths, or a Level 3 Vocational Programme at a Merit or above alongside three other GCSEs at grades 9-4 including either English or Maths.

Students that apply to do a BTEC Level 2 diploma must have at least four GCSEs at grade 3 or above, or a Level 2 Vocational Programme at a Merit or above.

== Notable people associated with Loreto ==
=== Alumni ===
- Chris Bisson, actor
- Michael Johnson, footballer (Manchester City)
- Micah Richards, footballer (Manchester City)
- Jason Manford, comedian
- John Harris, columnist (The Guardian)
- Mike Kane MP for Wythenshawe and Sale East (UK Parliament constituency)
- Karl Lucas, actor, comedian
- Pat McDonagh (1934-2014), fashion designer who became an important figure in Canadian fashion.
- Michaela Morgan, author
- Matthew Williamson, fashion designer
- John Bradley-West, actor (Game of Thrones)
- Carla Henry, actress
- Joshua Andrew Howard, para-athlete
- Danielle Jawando, author
- Hannah Witton, YouTube video creator

=== Teachers ===
- Pete Postlethwaite (OBE) (1946–2011), formerly Head of Drama at Loreto

== See also ==
- Loreto College, St Albans.
- Loreto Grammar School in nearby Trafford (known as Loreto Convent).
