= Veronica Brady =

Australian religious sister and writer (1929–2015)

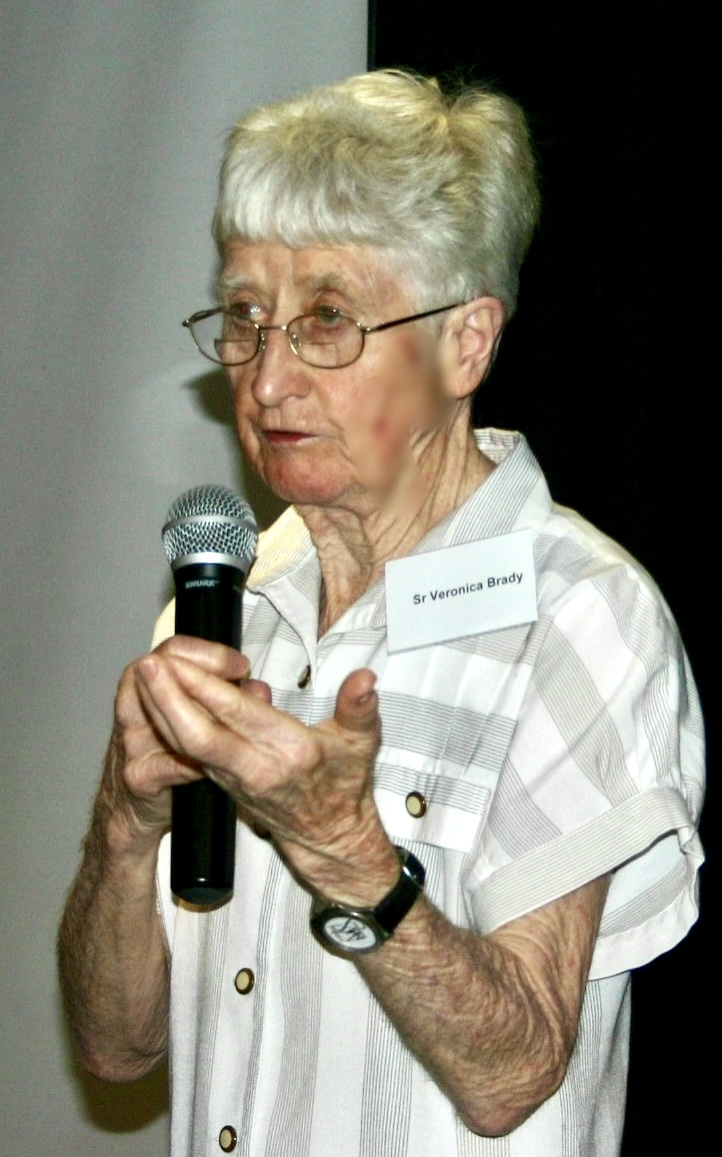
- Veronica Brady, South Brisbane 2006
- Born: Patricia Mary Brady; 5 January 1929
- Died: 20 August 2015

Veronica Brady IBVM (born Patricia Mary Brady; 5 January 1929 – 20 August 2015) was an Australian religious sister who was a noted writer and academic. She was one of the first Australian religious sisters to broadcast on radio and to teach at a secular university. She was a member of the inaugural board of the Australian Broadcasting Corporation in the 1980s.

Brady was an authority on Nobel Prize-winning Australian author Patrick White and wrote South of My Days, a biography of Australian poet Judith Wright.

== Early life and education ==
Patricia Mary Brady was born in Melbourne in 1929 (she took the name of "Veronica" upon joining her religious order). She matriculated from Loreto Mandeville at the age of 15 before attending Melbourne University. She went on to complete one of the first PhD degrees on Australian literature, graduating from the University of Toronto in 1969 after completing a thesis on the writing of Patrick White (as "Patricia Mary Brady").

== Career ==
Brady returned to teach at Loreto Mandeville as well as Loreto Kirribilli, where she first met White. She went to the University of Western Australia in 1972 and retired as a reader in 1994. She joined the Sisters of Loreto, and has been described as an early proponent of feminist ideals.

== Published works ==
=== Scholarly essays and reviews ===
Whilst White's work remained at the centre of Brady's writing and teaching, she also published scholarly essays on the fiction of Rolf Boldrewood, Joseph Furphy (a favourite), Tom Keneally, David Malouf, Les Murray, Henry Handel Richardson, Christina Stead and Randolph Stow. Another activity was reviewing and she published around 100 responses to new works of fiction, poetry and criticism. Published first in the UWA journal Westerly, her reviews eventually appeared in most major Australian literary and critical journals – Arena, Australian Book Review, Australian Historical Studies, Australian Journal of Cultural Studies, Australian Literary Studies, Australian Society, CRNLE Reviews Journal, Fremantle Arts Review, Helix, Island, Kunapipi, Makar, Overland, Southerly and Westerly – as well as newspapers such as The Age, Canberra Times, Sydney Morning Herald and the West Australian.

=== Books ===
Brady's books included The Future People: Christianity, Modern Culture and the Future (1971); The Mystics (1974); A Crucible of Prophets: Australians and the Question of God (1981); Playing Catholic: Essays on Four Catholic Plays (1991); Polyphonies of the Self (1993); and Caught in the Draught: Contemporary Australian Culture and Society (1994); as well as South of My Days: A Biography of Judith Wright (1998).

Her love of words was probably inherited from her Irish-Australian father. Childhood books that remained lifelong companions included The Magic Pudding, Winnie The Pooh and archy and mehitabel, from which she was fond of quoting; a particular favourite being the cockroach Mehitabel's maxim “toujours gai kid” and “there’s more than one dance in the old dame yet”, a line she often used in her later years.

== After retirement ==
Whilst continuing her work as a reviewer and speaker in general and academic forums, Brady completed a 586-page biographical study of Judith Wright titled South of My Days (also the title of an early poem by Wright). The biography draws on primary sources and interviews, and demonstrates the sympathy to the writer that Brady brought to the work of White, arguing that Wright's political activism was closely related to her poetry.

=== Candid critic ===
Brady was known for being outspoken. She publicly criticised the Vatican's stance on abortion, homosexuality and contraception, was involved in the Aboriginal rights movement and the anti-uranium mining lobby as well as supporting the ordination of women as priests in the Catholic Church. Her view of Australia's conservative political elite was, perhaps, best summed up by her forecasts as to which circle of Dante’s hell was the likely destination of various Liberal prime ministers.

Brady’s uncle Jack Collins, and cousins Geoff Collins and Michael Collins, played for the Melbourne Football Club.

ABC broadcaster Phillip Adams called her "my favourite catholic. The one of whom Pope John Paul II used to ask every morning when he woke up 'Is she dead yet?'."

Brady died on 20 August 2015 in Western Australia at the age of 86. She had been in care for the previous two years.

Kath Jordan's biography of Brady, Larrikin Angel, was published by Roundhouse Press in 2009.
