= Kate Eastman =

Australian human rights lawyer and academic

Kate Eastman AM SC (born 1966) is a leading Australian human rights lawyer and academic. She was co-founder of the Australian Lawyers for Human Rights (ALHR) in 1992 and was for many years President.

== Early life and education ==
Eastman was educated at Loreto College, Normanhurst, before obtaining her Bachelor of Arts/Bachelor of Laws from the University of New South Wales (UNSW), and a Graduate Diploma in Legal Practice (1991) and a Master of Laws (1997) from the University of Technology Sydney. She then studied international human rights law and private international law at University College London from where she graduated with distinction. She also holds a Diploma of International Human Rights Law from the European University Institute, Florence Italy.

== Career ==
Eastman has practised as a barrister in Sydney in the areas of human rights, discrimination, employment and administrative law since 1998. She has been involved in some high-profile cases including The Tampa, David Hicks, transgender marriage, same sex marriage, the Royal Commission and headline grabbing workplace sexual harassment and discrimination matters. In 2012 she was made senior counsel.

She actively contributes to raising awareness of human rights obligations within the legal profession. She is chair of the Australian Bar Association's Diversity and Inclusion Committee; a member of the Law Council of Australia's Business and Human Rights Working Group; and a member of the Law Council of Australia's National Human Rights Committee.

In 1998 she was the only Australian NGO representative accredited to participate in the UN negotiations for the establishment of the International Criminal Court in Rome.

Prior to her admission to the bar she worked as a solicitor at law firm Allen, Allen & Hemsley and as a senior legal officer at the Human Rights and Equal Opportunity Commission.

Eastman has lectured in human rights in Sydney at both the University of Technology and the University of Sydney, as well as at Monash University in Melbourne. She has also undertaken some international teaching programs and has been a visiting fellow at the University of Western Sydney and senior fellow and member of the Postgraduate Advisory Committee at Monash University Law Faculty.

Eastman has received a Law Foundation Justice Award for her contribution to pro bono work and in 2017 was awarded Change Champion of the Year at the NSW Women's Lawyers Achievement Awards. She is the winner of the 2019 Human Rights Law Award presented by the Australian Human Rights Commission. She was appointed Senior Counsel Assisting the Disability Royal Commission in 2019.

In the 2021 Queen's Birthday Honours Eastman was appointed a Member of the Order of Australia for "significant service to the law, to human rights, and to professional organisations". She is a Commissioner of the Law Reform Commission of New South Wales.
