= Parveen Talha =

Indian civil servant

- Born: Lucknow, Uttar Pradesh, India
- Occupation: Civil servant
- Parent: Mohammed Talha
- Relatives: Osama Talha, Kulsum Talha, Uzma Talha, Faraz Talha
- Awards: Padma Shri; President's Award for Distinguished Service

Parveen Talha is an Indian civil servant, reported to be the first Muslim woman to serve in any Class I civil service in India, the first Indian Revenue Service officer to become a member of the Union Public Service Commission and the first woman to serve in Narcotics Department of India. She was honoured by the Government of India, in 2014, by bestowing on her the Padma Shri, the fourth highest civilian award, for her services to Indian Civil Service.

== Biography ==
I find there are stories in every nook and corner that are waiting to be told, says Parveen Talha, about her career as a writer, So I will pursue my passion for writing now that I am a retired person

Parveen Talha was born in Lucknow, Uttar Pradesh in India, as one of the two children (her brother, Osama Talha, who later became a leading journalist, died young in 1995), in the famous Awadh family. Her father, Mohammed Talha, was a freedom fighter and a known lawyer, a participant in the Jang-e-Azadi independence struggle who chose to remain in India when his brother moved to Pakistan during the partition. Parveen did her schooling at Loreto Convent High School from where she passed Senior Cambridge in first division and continued the college studies at Loreto College. After passing MA in Economics from Lucknow University, Parveen joined the University as a Lecturer in 1965.

== Career and achievements ==
There was a large-scale leakage of opium going on in UP then, Parveen Talha said about her campaign against drug traffickers, While I tried my best to play a stringent officer dealing with certain illegal channels, poppy cultivators were surprised too because they had never seen a woman at that level

Parveen Talha started her career as a lecturer of economics at the Lucknow University in 1965 where she worked till 1969, the year she passed Indian Civil Service examination. She joined Indian Revenue Service in 1969, becoming the first Muslim woman to enter the Revenue Service. Later, she served at the Commissionerates at Mumbai and Kolkata and, also at the Central Excise Commissionerate.

The next move was to Narcotics Department as the Deputy Commissioner of Uttar Pradesh, fetching her another first as the only woman officer of the Central Bureau of Narcotics, where she had the official authority to confiscate properties of smugglers and drug traffickers.

After the stint at the Central Bureau of Narcotics, Parveen Talha was appointed as the Director General of the National Academy of Customs, Excise and Narcotics (NACEN), at their training department. She is credited with making NACEN an accredited training institute of the World Customs Organization's (WCO) for Asia-Pacific region. She is also reported to have introduced training modules for stopping the smuggling of ozone depleting substances. She was successful in signing a Memorandum of Understanding with United Nations Environment Program, making NACEN, the only training academy for imparting training for the control of ozone depleting substmces and environmental crimes.

Parveen Talha retired from the Revenue Service in 2004 as the senior most woman officer of the Customs and Central Excise and on 30 September 2004, became a member of the Union Public Service Commission. Talha was the first IRS officer and Muslim woman to become a member of UPSC. She retired from Government service on 3 October 2009.

After her retirement from public service, Parveen Talha took up writing. In 2013, she brought out her first book, Fida-e-Lucknow – Tales of the city and its people, a collection of 22 short stories, placed in the landscape of Lucknow, telling the stories of its women. The book was formally released by the Vice-President of India, Hamid Ansari.

- Parveen Talha (20 March 2013). Fida-E-Lucknow: Tales of the City and Its People. New Delhi: Niyogi Books. p. 198. ISBN 978-9381523704.

== Awards and recognitions ==
Parveen Talha is a recipient of President's Award for distinguished service, which she received in 2000. Fourteen years later, in 2014, the Government of India honoured her services to the Indian Civil Service by awarding her Padma Shri, the fourth among the highest Indian civilian awards.

== See also ==
- Indian Civil Service
