= Loreto College, Swords =

Secondary school for girls in Swords, County Dublin, Ireland

Coordinates: 53.45393°N 6.24490°W

- Swords, Co. Dublin; Ireland

Information
- Religious affiliations: Roman Catholic; Loreto Sisters
- Established: 1837; 189 years ago
- Gender: All-girls
- Age: 12 to 18

Loreto College is an all-girls public secondary school in Rivervalley, Swords, County Dublin, Ireland. The school was opened in 1837 and was situated at 41 - 46 North Great George's Street but moved to Swords in 1988. It is connected with the international group of schools served by the Sisters of Loreto.

== Notable alumni ==
- Marie Kean (1918–1993) - actress of stage and screen
- Sylvia Meehan (1929–2018) - campaigner for the rights of women and older people
- Moyra Barry (1886–1960) - artist
- Helena Concannon (née Walsh; 1878–1952) - historian, writer, language scholar and politician
- Mary Wallace (b. 1959) - Fianna Fáil politician.
