= Mary Eucharia Ryan =

Irish Loreto sister and education pioneer

Mother Mary Eucharia Ryan

Personal life
- Born: 1860 County Leitrim, Ireland
- Died: 1 May 1929 (aged 68–69) 77 St Stephen's Green, Dublin

Religious life
- Religion: Roman Catholic
- Order: Sisters of Loreto

Mother Mary Eucharia Ryan (7 October 1860 – 1 May 1929) was an Irish Loreto sister and pioneer of women's higher education.

== Life ==
Mary Eucharia Ryan was baptised Elizabeth Ryan at Templemain church, County Leitrim on 7 October 1860. Her parents, both educationalists originally from County Tipperary, were Laurence and Mary Ryan. On 7 November 1878, Ryan entered the Loreto Abbey noviciate in Rathfarnham, County Dublin, professing with the name Mary Eucharia on 11 May 1881. When she entered the convent, it was noted that she had English, Latin and French. The Loreto Sisters decided to provide university classes for Catholic women in Loreto College, St Stephen's Green in 1894 to provide such students with the ability to sit the arts examinations of the Royal University of Ireland as well as boarding facilities. Ryan taught classics and philosophy to these students, as well as encouraging students to study abroad using her contacts with religious sisters in Europe. During her time as the superior at the Loreto convent in Cambridge from 1901 to 1905, she had contact with the women's colleges of Cambridge University, Newnham and Girton.

After the establishment of the National University of Ireland (NUI) in October 1909, Ryan applied for approval of the Loreto courses by the NUI senate, and full recognition of the Loreto College by NUI on 27 January 1910. These applications were approved in 1911 by the episcopal standing committee, but refused by the NUI senate stating the university's charter forbade it. The Archbishop of Dublin, William Walsh, sanctioned the acquisition of Loreto University Hall, 77 St Stephen's Green, Dublin, which opened with Ryan as the superior on 15 October 1911. For a short time, with support from Walsh, the first-years arts course was recognised by NUI until November 1912. After this, Loreto Hall continued as a hostel for female university students, with the college returning focus to primary and secondary education.

Ryan was active with the Hall and women's education until her death on 1 May 1929 at 77 St Stephen's Green. The Loreto Bursary was founded in her honour, and is awarded to students entering University College Dublin with the highest mark in Latin or Greek in their Leaving Certificate.
