= Loreto Mandeville Hall =

Loreto Mandeville Hall Toorak

Location
- Toorak, Victoria; Australia; 37°50′52″S 145°0′51″E

Information
- Type: Independent single-sex primary and secondary day school
- Motto: Latin: Cruci Dum Spiro Fido (While I live, I believe in the Cross)
- Religious affiliations: The Institute of the Blessed Virgin Mary, Sisters of Loreto
- Denomination: Roman Catholic
- Established: 1924; 102 years ago 130 years in Melbourne
- Principal: Ms Angela O'Dwyer
- Years: P–12
- Gender: Girls
- Enrolment: 1,272 (2007)
- Campus type: Suburban
- Colours: Blue and gold
- Affiliations: Association of Independent Schools of Victoria; Junior School Heads Association of Australia; Association of Heads of Independent Schools of Australia; Alliance of Girls' Schools Australasia; Girls Sport Victoria
- Website: www.loretotoorak.vic.edu.au

Loreto Mandeville Hall Toorak is an independent Roman Catholic single-sex primary and secondary day school for girls, located in Toorak, a suburb of Melbourne, Victoria, Australia. It is one of many Loreto schools around the world, established by the Loreto Sisters founded some 400 years ago by Mary Ward.

The Loreto Sisters purchased Mandeville Hall in 1924 having previously established schools in Ballarat and Albert Park with encouragement from St Mary MacKillop. Mandeville Hall was built in 1867 and is on the Victorian Heritage Register and is considered of national and international significance.

Loreto Mandeville Hall had a co-educational Early Learning Centre established in 2002 which was in partnership with St. Kevin's College. This partnership was dissolved at the end of 2020 and ownership of the St Peter's Early Learning Centre was transferred to St Kevin's College. Both the junior school and secondary school are located at 10 Mandeville Crescent, Toorak.

== Affiliations ==
Loreto Mandeville Hall is associated with the Association of Independent Schools of Victoria (AISV), Junior School Heads Association of Australia (JSHAA), Association of Heads of Independent Schools of Australia (AHISA), Alliance of Girls' Schools Australasia (AGSA), and a founding member of Girls Sport Victoria (GSV). The school also participates in many activities with St. Kevin's College and Xavier College. The school also has a long association with St Mary's College at the University of Melbourne which was also established by the Loreto Sisters.

== Campus ==
Loreto Mandeville Hall is located on a single campus with the Junior School, Rathfarnham, separated from the Senior School by an Oval. The campus features a number of multi-purpose courts for tennis, netball, and basketball. The 'Barry Centre' houses two swimming pools, a Gymnasium, Gymnastics centre, photography classrooms, art classrooms, weight room, rowing room, health classrooms, and basketball court. The school has a canteen known as Cafe Mandeville. The Mandeville Centre has a Library, Theatrette, and a dedicated Year 12 centre which features a common room and balcony garden. In 2019 six connected school buildings known as St George's Extension were demolished to make way for a new building to accommodate students in Years 7 to 9.

== Curriculum ==
Loreto Mandeville Hall offers a range of Victorian Certificate of Education (VCE) subjects, approximately 28. There are also 11 University studies that Year 12 students are able to elect as part of their VCE program. All students are required to study mathematics, science, and technology through to Year 7. The school offers a range of STEM from Year 8 that are elective.

The school operates an Individual Differences program from Prep to Year 6 to acknowledge in the subjects of English and Mathematics to support high achieving students. Philosophy is also taught to students across Years 7 to 9. Students are provided with a number of Extension Programs that include Debating across Years 7 to 12. Opportunity is also provided for students to participate in;

- Years 5 & 6 Maths Olympiad and Maths Challenge
- Geography ‘Big Week Out’ – the Australian Geography Competition
- National Simpson Prize for History students in Years 9 and 10
- National History Challenge for students in Years 7–11
- The Australian Maths Competition
- Victorian ‘Da Vinci Decathlon’

In 2018 and 2020, Loreto Mandeville Hall was the top ranked Catholic girls school in Victoria. In 2020, students achieved the following VCE results, with seven students receiving the Premier's VCE Award;

VCE results 2016-2025
Year	Rank	Median study score	Scores of 40+ (%)	Cohort size
2016	9	36	31.1	218
2017	15	36	27	208
2018	15	36	26.7	245
2019	17	36	26.7	275
2020	7	35	29.3	272
2021	20	35	24.7	272
2022	26	36	23	258
2023	7	35	29.6	273
2024	22	35	26.4	262
2025	18	36	24.7	264

The Positive Education curriculum is based on the PERMA model developed by Professor Martin Seligman with the addition of Positive Health.

== Loreto Mandeville Hall House system ==
The school has four Houses, three of which are named after Loreto Sisters, and one after the founder of the IBVM. The Houses have several student leaders for different activities in the School, such as Music, Sport, Drama and Debating.

Barry (yellow)
Mornane (green)
Mulhall (red)
Ward (blue)

The Houses compete in several inter-house events including sport, musical arts and theatre studies.

== Crest and motto ==
It is thought that the Loreto crest was developed by Mother Teresa Ball in the 1850s. There are six parts to the crest that are of significance.

1. Maria Regina Angelorum – Latin meaning Mary, Queen of Angels.
2. Cruci Dum Spiro Fido – Latin motto meaning While I live, I believe in the Cross, literally "In the cross, while I breathe I have faith"
3. The cross
4. The Sacred Heart of Jesus surmounted by the cross
5. The anchor of hope
6. The loving heart of Mary

A significant song associated with the Loreto schools is the holiday hymn, Causa Nostrae Laetitae.

== Co-curricular activities ==
=== Debating ===
Loreto Mandeville Hall enters students from Years 7–12 in the Debating Association of Victoria's (DAV) Debating Competition. The school also competes in friendly competitions against boys schools such as St. Kevin's College, Xavier College and Melbourne Grammar School.

=== Music ===
Some 700 students participate in weekly instrumental music lessons which includes 30 bands, choirs, orchestras, instrumental ensembles and chamber groups. Music is compulsory at Rathfarnham with the program consisting of Suzuki Strings for Prep students, a Recorder Program in Year 2, a ‘Loreto Sings’ and Strings Program in Year 3, Percussion in Year 4, and a Brass and Woodwind Program in Year 5 and 6. The Music Faculty has 46 staff. In the Senior School, complimentary tuition is provided to new students in an Instrumental Program across a variety of instruments. In Year 8 Music becomes an elective subject.

The school holds a school wide annual Music Concert at Hamer Hall as well as a Showcase Concert at the Melbourne Recital Centre.

=== Sport ===
Loreto Mandeville Hall has a Physical Education program ranges from developing skills, the physics of the human body. The program offers more than 20 different sports: tennis, athletics, softball, water polo, basketball, swimming, surf lifesaving, soccer, diving, badminton, rowing, volleyball, golf, netball, cross country, snowsports, hockey, cricket, AFL and gymnastics/aerobics.

Loreto Mandeville Hall is a member of Schools Sport Victoria, Preparatory-Year 6, and Girls Sport Victoria (GSV), Years 7–12, which includes 24 Girls’ Schools who compete with across a range of sports during weekly competition. Optional sports run through GSV include golf, triathlon, cycle sport, table tennis and volleyball.

In 2019, Loreto Mandeville Hall won the GSV Athletics Championship for the sixth year in a row.

The Loreto Mandeville Hall rowing program is one of the top school rowing programs nationally. The school Rowing Squad comprises over 170 athletes from Years 9-12 who compete in the annual Head of the Schoolgirls’ Regatta. In 2019 Loreto entered a rowing crew in the Henley Royal Regatta on the River Thames.

Loreto Mandeville Hall Aerobics team has enjoyed success in State and National competitions.

Loreto Aquatic has a number of squads that range from teams for students, to athletes competing at State and National levels.

==== GSV premierships ====
Loreto Mandeville Hall has won the following GSV premierships.

- Athletics (7) – 2014, 2015, 2016, 2017, 2018, 2019, 2022
- Basketball (2) – 2003, 2015
- Netball – 2023
- Tennis – 2008
- Water Polo (7) – 2008, 2012, 2014, 2015, 2019, 2022, 2023
- Softball - 2026

=== Theatre Studies ===
The program commences in Year 6 with a Musical Production. Theatre Studies is then compulsory in Year 7 and is available as elective in Years 8 to 10 and offered in Years 11 and 12 as a VCE subject. All students from Years 7 to 12 participate in an annual Performing Arts Festival.

Loreto Mandeville Hall collaborates with Xavier College with Winter and Spring Plays, and the Senior and Middle School hold a Musical with St Kevin's College. Years 7 and 8 hold a Play and participate in an Interhouse Theatresports Festival.

As part of the program Voice and Speech tuition is provided to students in Years 5 to 12. Other opportunities exist for students in the Eisteddfod by the Bay, Boroondara Eisteddfod, and AMEB examinations in Speech and Drama.

== Notable alumnae ==
- M. Allan Kenny, racing car driver for Jaguar
- Veronica Brady, academic, writer
- Dame Carmen Callil, writer, critic, publisher (founded Virago Press)
- Elizabeth Curtain, a judge of the Supreme Court of Victoria since 2006; previously County Court of Victoria judge (1993–2006)
- Kathleen Fitzpatrick AO, historian – student at Loreto Convent Albert Park and Portland, Victoria
- Natalie Hunter, presenter on Network Ten children's television series Totally Wild
- Angie McMahon, singer-songwriter, musician
- Clare O'Neil, federal member for Hotham in the Australian House of Representatives; former Mayor of the City of Greater Dandenong; youngest female mayor in Australian history
- June Wright (1919–2012), author of six murder mysteries
- Olivia Wells, Miss Universe Australia 2013
- Alex Saundry, AFLW footballer, player manager
- Charlie Rowbottom, AFLW footballer
- Aisling Utri, AFLW footballer
- Monique Ryan, federal member for Kooyong in the Australian House of Representatives, former paediatrician

== See also ==
- Catholic education in Australia
