= St. Louis School, Claremont, Western Australia =

Former school in Claremont, Western Australia

Coordinates: 31°59′02″S 115°46′30″E

St. Louis School /ˈluːɪs/ was a Catholic boys' school in Claremont, Western Australia, between 1938 and 1976.

== History ==
The school was founded by the Jesuits – their only school in Western Australia in 1987. It was previously a private property called Hinemoa, purchased in 1901 by Alexander Clarke Munro, who was manager of the Jarrahdale Timber Station, became Superintendent of the Millars Karri and Jarrah Company and was the Western Australian Government's representative at the Paris and Glasgow 1901 Exhibition. On 23 May 1938, Hinemoa, located in Claremont in the western suburbs of Perth, on the site of the former Hinemoa Homestead which had been sold to the Catholic Church in 1932. The homestead building was used for the junior school, while new buildings were erected to house the senior school, the Jesuit community, and the boarders.

The school was named after Aloysius Gonzaga, an early Jesuit saint, also known as Luís de Gonzaga. Its motto was Altiora Peto (transl. I seek higher things).

The Jesuits ran the school until 1971, when it was handed over to the Catholic Archdiocese of Perth. Archbishop Lancelot Goody appointed a school council chaired by Judge John Lavan to manage the school.

St. Louis School amalgamated with the Loreto Convent girls' school to form John XXIII College, which opened in 1977.

The site of St. Louis School is now occupied by the St. Louis Retirement Estate, which has preserved the old Administration building.

== House system ==
St. Louis School enrolled boys from ages seven to seventeen, both day pupils and boarders.

Until the mid-1960s, the year grades were named after levels in the traditional Jesuit curriculum: Elements, Rudiments, Grammar (I and II) 3rd reverse this order, Syntax (I and II) reverse this order, Poetry and Rhetoric.

Initially there were three houses named after the Jesuit saints: Gonzaga (blue), Kostka (green) and Xavier (red). A fourth house Loyola (white) was introduced in 1976 to ease the amalgamation with Loreto Convent which already had a fourth house.

== Notable alumni ==
Former pupils of St. Louis School are known as Old Louisians. Notable alumni include:

- John Adams, Master of the Supreme Court of Western Australia from 1990 to 1996
- Michael Barker, Judge of the Federal Court of Australia
- Tony Buhagiar, Australian Rules footballer
- Professor Allan Fels, former Chairman of the Australian Competition and Consumer Commission
- John Finlay-Jones, Deputy Vice-Chancellor and Vice-President, Edith Cowan University (ECU)
- Greg Flynn, novelist
- Robert French, former Chief Justice of the High Court of Australia
- Desmond Heenan, former Judge of the Supreme Court of Western Australia
- D’Arcy Holman, Professor of Public Health, University of Western Australia
- Ben Lochtenberg, Rhodes Scholar, Western Australia (1954)
- Bernie Lynch, rock musician (Eurogliders)
- Robert Mazza, Judge of the Supreme Court of Western Australia
- Philip McCann, Judge of the District Court of Western Australia
- John McCosker OAM Warrant Officer RAAF 37Sqn C130E Aircrew 1967-1991
- Mark McKenna, Deputy Vice-Chancellor and Provost, University of Notre Dame Australia
- Gordon Staples, former Master of the Supreme Court of Western Australia
- John Toohey, former Justice of the High Court of Australia
- Mark Trowell, Queen's Counsel, Western Australia

== See also ==
- List of Jesuit educational institutions
