= Loreto Abbey, Dalkey =

Private secondary school for girls in Dalkey, Dublin, Ireland

Coordinates: 53.279778°N 6.099972°W

Loreto Abbey Dalkey is a Catholic secondary school for girls, under the auspices of the Sisters of Loreto. The school is owned by the board of trustees of the Sisters of Loreto. Adjoining is a Loreto Girls National School.

== History ==
Loreto Abbey Dalkey opened as a school in 1843; it also has a member house of the Institute of the Blessed Virgin Mary (IBVM), founded in the 17th century by Mary Ward (1585 - 1645), a pioneer of education for Catholic women, today having establishments on five continents.

The Irish branch of the institute was founded in 1821 by Frances Teresa Ball (1794 - 1861), a native of Dublin. Her first foundation was at Rathfarnham and was called Loreto Abbey.

When Loreto Abbey Dalkey was founded, Dalkey was a small fishing village, though in earlier times it had been well known as one of the ports for Dublin. Along its rocky seashore lay a commons area which Frances Teresa Ball perceived to be an eminently suitable site for her foundation. While negotiating its purchase, she rented Bulloch Castle, opposite Bulloch Harbour, where she operated a small boarding and day school from 1841 until 1843. In 1842 she succeeded in buying the site at Dalkey. Ball was her own architect and her castellated building of Dalkey granite was opened as a boarding and day school on 17 August 1843. In 1982, the boarding school closed.

== Operations ==
Loreto Abbey Dalkey is a private, fee-paying school. There are about 40 rooms in the school. It has 630 pupils on its rolls today, and has 70 members of staff. The principal of the school is Mr Robert Dunne.

== Notable past pupils ==
- Hilary Frayne Weston - 26th Lieutenant Governor of Ontario
- Joanne McNally - Comedian and Co-host of the ‘My Therapist Ghosted Me’ podcast
- Jennifer Carroll MacNeill - Minister for Health
