= Loretto Academy (Chicago) =

- Loretto Academy, c. 1910

Location
- 1447 E. 65th Street; Chicago, Illinois; United States; 41°46′36.4″N 87°35′21.8″W

Information
- Religious affiliation: Roman Catholic
- Established: August 1906
- Closed: 1972
- Authority: Archdiocese of Chicago
- Oversight: Institute of the Blessed Virgin Mary
- Campus type: Urban

Loretto Academy of the Immaculate Conception in Woodlawn-Chicago is a former Catholic high school for girls in Chicago's Woodlawn neighborhood.

== History ==
The school was established by the Loreto Sisters and opened in August 1906. The school admitted its first African-American students in 1949. As Woodlawn's demographics changed in the 1950s, the school's did as well. By 1960, it had only ten Euro-American students and by the early 1970s it had a completely African-American student body. The school closed in 1972. The building was sold to the Woodlawn Community Development Corporation and served as substance abuse treatment center called Entry House. Entry House closed in 2012, and the building was sold at a foreclosure auction on October 28, 2019. It was included in Preservation Chicago's 7 Most Endangered list in 2019.
