= Loreto Convent, Asansol =

Loreto Convent Asansol
- Asansol, West Bengal; India

Information
- Type: Public
- Religious affiliation: Catholic
- Established: 1877; 149 years ago
- Founder: Sisters of Loreto
- Principal: V Thomas Jency
- Faculty: 78
- Gender: Girls
- Campus: Urban
- Color: white
- Affiliation: ICSE
- Website: Official site

Loreto Convent is an all-girls convent school located in Asansol, Paschim Bardhaman district, West Bengal, India.

== History ==
This school was founded in 1877 for the children of the Railway Colony and now also serves the Raniganj coal belt and the industrial area of Kulti in Asansol. The first five Sisters came with Mother Delphine Hart in response to a request from the Jesuit parish priest, Fr. Martin Jacques (1835–1890). They began the school with 35 pupils in a small bungalow near the presbytery. Boys and girls were admitted at first. Later the present property was acquired, and in 1885 a boarding school for girls only was started in a three-story building facing the railway tank. The top floor was damaged by the 1897 Assam earthquake and had to be demolished leaving the present two stories. Between 1909 and 1928 other wings were added for classrooms and dormitories. The students were prepared for the Junior and Senior Cambridge examinations.

In 1942 the school building was requisitioned by the military for a hospital and the 12 Sisters and 75 boarders went to live in rented houses in Simla till 1946.

Mother Teresa taught at the school beginning in January 1947.

In 1953 the Modern School Final exam replaced the Junior Cambridge, and the first batch of students was sent up for the Pitmans Commercial exam. There were now 221 girls and 90 boys in the primary school. In 1962 the foundations were laid for another school building – the present secondary school wing and in 1977 the new Primary wing, Mary Ward building, was begun.

From 1963 boys were no longer admitted. In 1971 Mother Magdalena opened a small dispensary in the presbytery premises and it flourished, with a daily attendance of at least 100 poor people till she was no longer able to work in 1984. In 1974 the new ICSE pattern was introduced and in 1983 the beginning of the academic year was changed from January to March. The Class 11 (ISC) was introduced but had to be discontinued in 1985 due to insufficient pupils for the Arts course offered. In 1991 the hostel was closed. A parallel school for under-privileged children was begun in 1992, Ankur Vidyalaya, and in 1994 knitting and tailoring classes were also started. In 2001 the former dormitory became a temporary home for 23 Santhal girls who were school dropouts and were prepared for a year to join regular classes again. 2001/2002 saw a year-long celebration of 125 years of the school's existence. The old building has been reconstructed.

== Noted alumni ==
- Sudeshna Sinha – Physicist
- Sharmila Tagore – Bollywood actress
- Agnimitra Paul - Fashion designer
- Meenakshi Banerjee - Scientist

== See also ==
- List of Loreto Colleges and schools
- List of schools in West Bengal
