= Loreto Convent, Claremont =

Loreto Convent
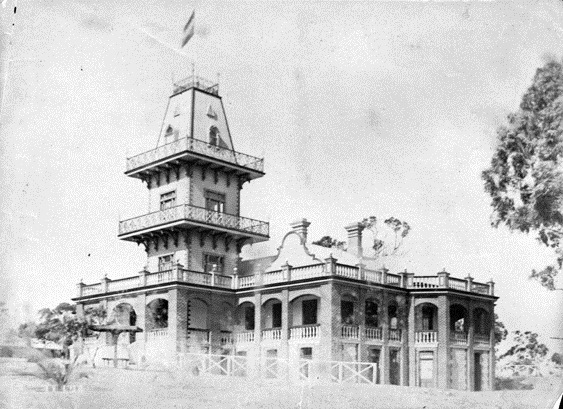
- Osborne Hotel, Claremont. c.1895. Occupied by Loreto Convent from 1901.
- Claremont, Western Australia; Australia

Information
- School type: Private school, single-sex, secondary school
- Established: 1901
- Closed: 1976
- Gender: Girls
- Campus type: Suburban

Loreto Convent was a Catholic convent which operated as a girls' school in Claremont, Western Australia between 1901 and 1976.

== Building ==
In 1894, businessman James Grave built the Osborne Hotel on a cliff-top in Claremont. Considered to be Perth's finest hotel, it had panoramic views of the Indian Ocean and Swan River and included a tower and raised turrets and was surrounded by two acres (0.8 ha) of landscaped gardens. In 1898 Graves found himself "financially embarrassed" and sold the hotel to William Dalgety Moore.

== Convent ==
The property was purchased by the Catholic Institute of the Blessed Virgin Mary in 1901. The convent was formally known as Loreto Osborne, Claremont. A chapel and sleeping accommodation for the sisters were built in 1938 and in 1963 the old hotel building was demolished to make way for a new building.

In 1963 the senior pupils from Loreto Nedlands were moved to the Claremont school, and in 1977 Loreto Osborne amalgamated with St. Louis boys' school to form John XXIII College. The school remained the senior campus of the college until the latter's move to Mount Claremont in 1986, and the site was subsequently occupied by the Western Australian International College.

The convent buildings were demolished in 1990, with residential housing built on the location at 101–109 Bindaring Parade, Claremont. The 70 feet (21 m) high, 1937-built bell tower was rebuilt in 1991 using the original bricks, in William Street, Northbridge.

== Notable alumni ==
- Judy Davis, actress
- Judy Edwards, politician
- Jennifer Hagan, actress
- Eileen Joyce, pianist
- Margaret McAleer, politician
- Robin Miller, the "Sugarbird Lady", pioneering nurse aviator
