= Loreto Municipality =

Loreto Municipality may refer to:

- Loreto Municipality, Bolivia
- Loreto Municipality, Baja California Sur, Mexico
- Loreto Municipality, Zacatecas, Mexico
