= Loreto High School, Chorlton =

Loreto High School

Location
- Nell Lane; Manchester, M21 7SW; England; 53.4338°N 2.2621°W

Information
- Type: Voluntary aided comprehensive
- Religious affiliation: Roman Catholic
- Established: c. 1960s 2007 (present school)
- Local authority: Manchester City Council
- Department for Education URN: 105574 Tables
- Ofsted: Reports
- Head teacher: Catherine Hughes (Formerly Peter Tite)
- Gender: Coeducational
- Age: 11 to 16
- Enrolment: 750~
- Website: http://www.loretochorlton.co.uk

Loreto High School is a coeducational Catholic high school in the Manchester suburb of Chorlton-cum-Hardy. It was the first IBVM (Loreto Sisters) school to be coeducational from the very beginning and the first Loreto secondary school in the area since Loreto College was reduced to a sixth form college during the 1970s. Since 2023, it has been a European Parliament Ambassador School.

== History ==
Loreto High School was originally St Thomas Aquinas High School, formerly Marist High School, a girls' grammar school founded during the 1960s. Prior to the rebranding, St Thomas Aquinas had a poor reputation in the community and was one of the worst performing schools in the UK. It came under the trusteeship of the Loreto Sisters and was renamed Loreto High School in 2007.

== Academics ==
Since the renaming, the school's academic performance has improved. It was rated "outstanding" and "good" in all aspects at the 2010 Diocesan inspection report and has been commended by Ofsted for "good practice" in its teaching.

In March 2020, due to the COVID-19 pandemic in the United Kingdom, the school, along with all of the schools in the UK and abroad, was shut until further notice, leaving students into home learning. Due to their GCSEs being cancelled, the Year 11 students left the school three months earlier.
