= St Peter's Roman Catholic High School, Manchester =

St Peter's RC High School

Location
- Kirkmanshulme Lane; Gorton; Manchester, M12 4WB; England; 53.4596°N 2.1925°W

Information
- Type: Voluntary aided school
- Motto: Follow Me
- Religious affiliation: Roman Catholic
- Established: 1999
- Local authority: Manchester
- Department for Education URN: 131880 Tables
- Ofsted: Reports
- Head teacher: Stephen Gabriel
- Gender: Coeducational
- Age: 11 to 16
- Website: http://www.stpetershigh.com

St Peter's RC High School is a Roman Catholic High School on Kirkmanshulme Lane in Belle Vue, Manchester, England.

== History ==
The school opened in 1999, and at the time of its last Ofsted inspection, held 1000 pupils. The new, purpose built, school building opened in 2003 and was extended in 2010 with the addition of eight new classrooms and the refurbishment of the main school to provide improved facilities for pupils with special needs. A chapel was also built near the front entrance and completed in 2013.

== Notable former pupils ==
- Shayne Ward, singer
- Theo Graham, actor
