= Loreto Normanhurst =

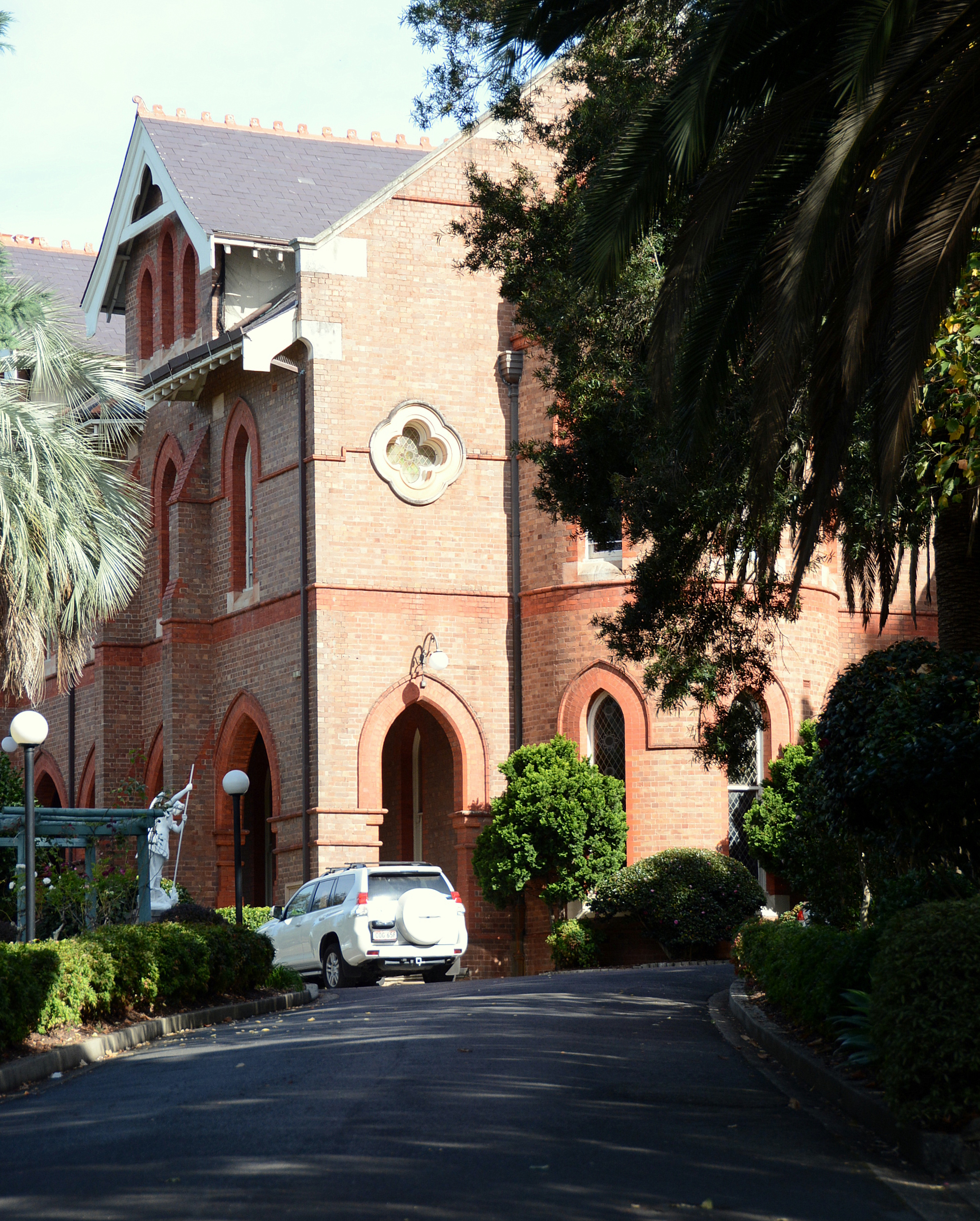
- The college today

Location
- Normanhurst, upper North Shore of Sydney, New South Wales; Australia
- 33°43′38″S 151°5′51″E

Information
- Type: Independent comprehensive single-sex primary and secondary day and boarding school
- Motto: Latin: Cruci Dum Spiro Fido (While I Live, I Trust in the Cross)
- Religious affiliation: Institute of the Blessed Virgin Mary or Loreto Sisters
- Denomination: Roman Catholic
- Established: 1897; 129 years ago
- Principal: Marina Ugonotti
- Staff: ~250
- Years: 5–12
- Gender: Girls
- Enrolment: c. 1,200 (2024)
- Colours: Navy blue and yellow
- Slogan: Growing Individuals and Communities
- Affiliations: Association of Heads of Independent Schools of Australia; Association of Independent Schools of New South Wales; Australian Boarding Schools' Association; Alliance of Girls' Schools Australasia; Association of Heads of Independent Girls' Schools
- Website: www.loretonh.nsw.edu.au

Loreto Normanhurst is an independent Catholic, primary and secondary day and boarding school for girls, located in Normanhurst, a suburb on the upper North Shore of Sydney, New South Wales, Australia.

Established in 1897, Loreto has a current enrolment of approximately 1,200 students from Year 5 to Year 12, including over 200 boarders, and is the largest girls' boarding school in New South Wales. In 2006, the school was named among the top ten innovative schools in Australia. Commencing in 2015, the school reopened their primary school for girls in years 5 and 6.

Loreto Normanhurst is affiliated with the Association of Heads of Independent Schools of Australia (AHISA), the Association of Independent Schools of New South Wales (AISNSW), the Australian Boarding Schools' Association (ABSA), the Alliance of Girls' Schools Australasia (AGSA), and is a member of the Association of Heads of Independent Girls' Schools (AHIGS).

The school is one of many around the world established by the Institute of the Blessed Virgin Mary, or Loreto Sisters, founded some 400 years ago by Mary Ward, and its Sydney sister school is Loreto Kirribilli. There are five other Loreto schools across Australia, in Melbourne, Ballarat, Adelaide, Brisbane and Perth.

== History ==
Mother Gonzaga Barry led the Loreto nuns to Sydney from Ballarat, Victoria in 1892, establishing a school in rented premises at Randwick. Within five years, the school had grown significantly, and a separate school for the boarders was deemed necessary. Mother Gonzaga's prayers for an appropriate site were answered during a visit to Sydney in 1896, as Mother Oliver explained:

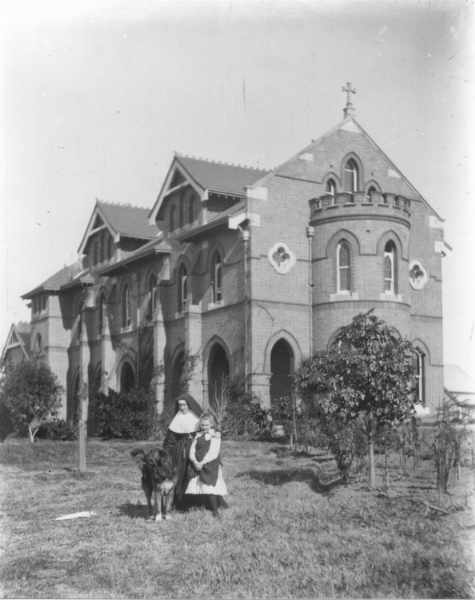
Buildings and gardens, 1897

Mr Frank Coffee of Wahroonga sent her an urgent message to come and see a property that was for sale a short distance from his home. It had been raining, but as the nuns arrived at the site, the sun burst through the clouds and formed a beautiful rainbow over the estate.

This land was purchased, and the foundation stone for the new convent was laid on 28 February 1897 by Cardinal Moran. The school opened late in 1897 as "Loreto Convent, Hornsby" with 15 boarders, many of them girls who had come from Randwick.

Although primarily a boarding school at this time, Loreto did accept a small number of day students from the local Hornsby area, including some young boys. Enrolments grew over the following decades; however, the Wars and Depression proved difficult times. Following World War II, the surrounding shire developed and day girl numbers began to equal that of boarders, gradually overtaking them to the present situation where there are many more day girls than boarders.

Since 2001, the school has maintained an end of year graduation tradition where two year 12 students release one white bird each to signify "freedom" and "letting go". In 2024, animal welfare concerns were raised regarding this tradition, with animal rights activists claiming the move increases their "risk of death from starvation, dehydration or predation". The provider of the birds stated that they are white racing pigeons with a "99 per cent" return rate.

== Principals ==
Ordinal	Officeholder	Term start	Term end	Time in office	Notes
1	M. Eulalia Hyland	1935	1938	2–3 years	
2	M. Joseph Michael Ritchie	1939	1939	0 years	
3	M. Judith Sullivan	1940	1942	1–2 years	
4	M. Thomas Farley	1942	1943	0–1 years	
5	M. Antoinette Hayden	1943	1945	1–2 years	
6	M. Rosario North	1946	1956	9–10 years	
7	M. Miriam Nowotny	1957	1964	6–7 years	
8	M. Josephine Little	1965	1967	1–2 years	
9	Jeanne Cover	1968	1970	1–2 years	
10	Deirdre Rofe	1971	1975	3–4 years	
11	Maureen Saunders	1976	1981	4–5 years	
12	Dian Stuart	1982	1988	5–6 years	
13	Denise Demarchelier	1989	1993	3–4 years	
14	Dr Leoni Degenhardt	1994	2008	13–14 years	
15	Barbara Watkins	2008	2018	9–10 years	
16	Marina Ugonotti	2019	incumbent	6–7 years	

== House system ==
As with most Australian schools, Loreto Normanhurst utilises a house system. The school currently has eight houses, which play an important role in the pastoral program at the school. They are:

House	Colour	Details
Aston	Purple	Named after Aston Lodge which became the first Loreto school in Sydney in 1892. Built in 1865 by John Watkins, and designed by Edmund Blacket, it is now part of the Emanuel School in Stanley Street, Randwick.
Barry	Gold	Named after Mother Gonzaga Barry who led the first group of Loreto sisters to Australia from Ireland in 1875. She began the first Loreto school in Ballarat, Victoria, and soon after followed that with schools in other states.
Kendall	Aqua	Named after Mother Evangeline Kendall IBVM, a teacher and art critic, who contributed profoundly to Loreto Normanhurst from 1948 until her death in 1996. Mother Evangeline is buried in the school's bush cemetery.
Kuring-gai	Orange	Named after the Kuring-gai people, the traditional owners of the land on which the school is located.
Maye	Maroon/Pink	Named after Sister Kevin Maye, who came from Ireland to Ballarat in 1920, and shortly after to Normanhurst. She is buried in the school's cemetery.
Mornane	Green	Named after Mother Stanislaus Mornane who began at Loreto Ballarat in 1876. Here she met Mother Gonzaga Barry and other pioneering Loreto nuns who had come from Ireland the year before, and subsequently, in 1879, she joined them as the first Australian to become a member of the order. In 1916 became Superior at Loreto Normanhurst, moving in 1924 to Loreto Kirribilli as Superior. Her last years were spent in the Normanhurst community, and upon her death in 1943 she was buried in the Loreto Normanhurst cemetery.
Mulhall	Red	Named after Mother Stanislaus Mulhall, one of the women who laid the foundations of the Loreto tradition in Australia. Mulhall worked as the Mistress of Novices for 30 years, and was largely hidden from most people.
Ward	Blue	Named after Mary Ward, foundress of the Institute of the Blessed Virgin Mary (IBVM). Born in England in 1585, she travelled across Europe, founding schools in many countries.

The houses are an important part of the schools community. To keep the members of the houses together, they make sure the lockers are surrounded by the house mates.

== Notable alumnae ==
- Jenny Brockie – broadcaster
- Kate Eastman SC – human rights lawyer and academic
- Gordi (Sophie Payten; 2010)– musician
- Catherine Livingstone – former director of Macquarie Bank, chair of CSIRO, director of Sydney Institute, and many other positions
- Elise McCann – actress and musical theatre performer
- Jessica McNamee – actor Home and Away, Packed to the Rafters, Battle of the Sexes, The Meg, The Vow, "Mortal Kombat"
- Clare Martin – CEO of ACOSS, former Chief Minister of the Northern Territory
- Montaigne (Jessica Cerro) – musician
- Zoe Naylor – actor, McLeod's Daughters
- Victoria Pendergast – Australian Winter Paralympic skier
- Kimberley Starr – novelist
- Monica Trapaga – singer and TV presenter

== See also ==
- List of Catholic schools in New South Wales
- List of boarding schools in Australia
- Catholic education in Australia
