= Our Lady of Loretto Roman Catholic Church and Cemetery =

Historic site in Sauk County, Wisconsin, US

- U.S. National Register of Historic Places
- U.S. Historic district
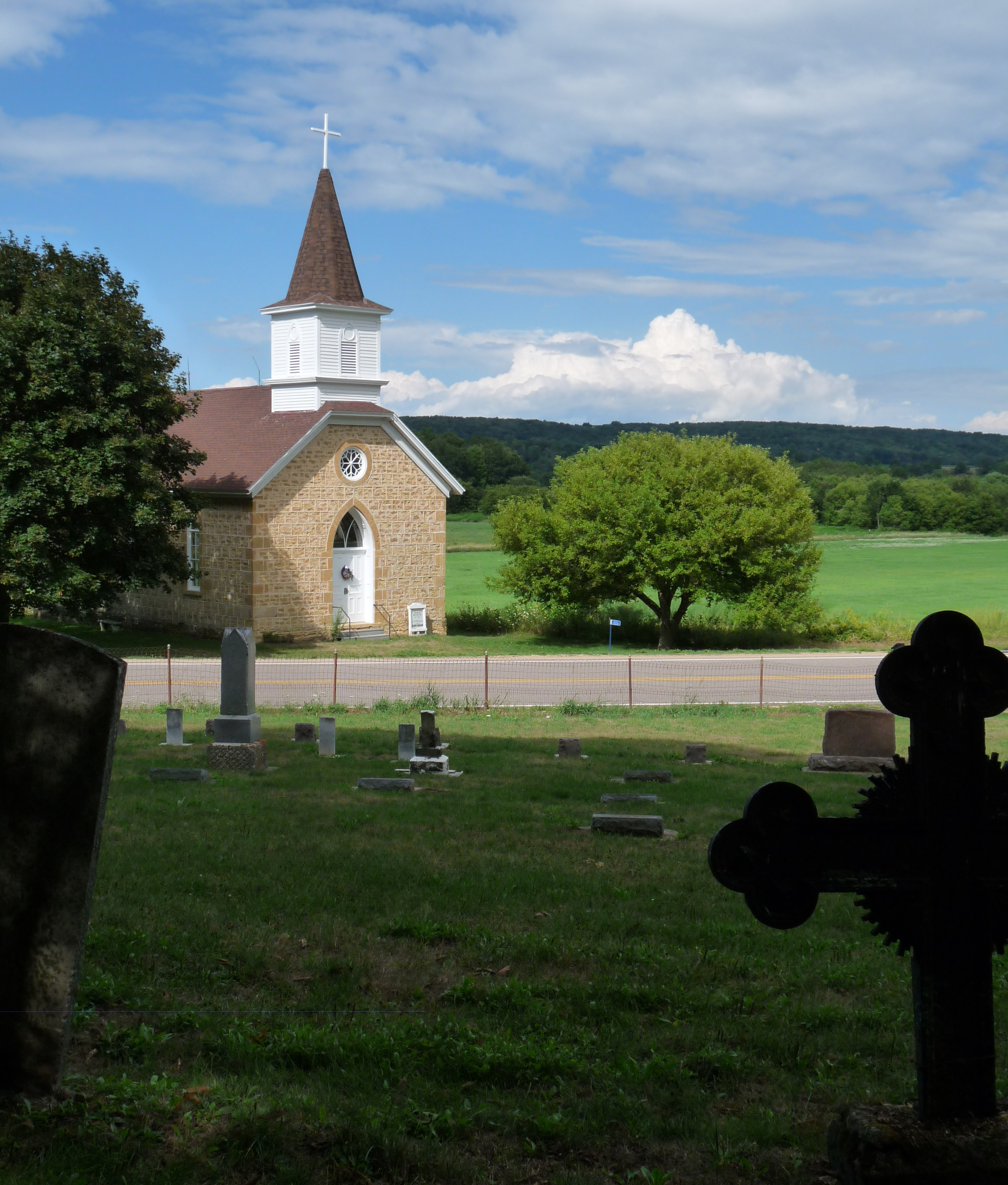

- Location within Wisconsin Location within the United States
- Location: Co. Hwy. C, 1 mi. W of Denzer, Honey Creek, Wisconsin
- Coordinates: 43°21′3″N 89°54′17″W
- Area: 7.2 acres (2.9 ha)
- Built: 1880
- Architectural style: Gothic Revival
- NRHP reference No.: 90000378
- Added to NRHP: March 9, 1990

Our Lady of Loretto Roman Catholic Church and Cemetery is a historic rural church on County Highway C, one mile west of Denzer in Honey Creek, Wisconsin, United States. It was built in 1880 as a mission church for German settlers and was added to the National Register in 1990.

Honey Creek was founded in 1852 as a mission of St. Aloysius Catholic parish in Sauk City under Reverend Adelbert Inama. St. Aloysius also established Saint Luke's of Plain and Saint Patrick's of Loreta as missions about the same time. Worship was first held at Honey Creek in the living room of Katherine and John George Leidig, with the missionary priest walking 13 miles from Sauk City. By 1862 people were buried in the current cemetery at the foot of the bluff. In 1867 a log church was built on the cemetery's side of the road, but it burned shortly after, and the congregation resumed services in Leidigs' home.

In 1880 the parish built the stone church very much as it stands today, across the road from the cemetery. Its walls are yellow limestone, randomly laid by local stonemasons Kasper Steuber and/or Peter Mettel and Nicolaus Allart. This uncoursed stone is framed by quoins of dressed limestone, and windows and doors are framed in the same. To make the church look more formal, the masons laid lines of mortar over the face of the uncoarsed stone, to suggest cut blocks. Windows and doors have lancet arches, a hallmark of Gothic architecture. Above the centered front door is a rose window, and above that is a square frame belfry with an octagonal steeple, topped with a simple cross.

Inside is a single room, with twelves rows of original wooden pews on each side of a centered main aisle. At the front stands a wooden Gothic-style altar built by Erhard Brielmaier of Milwaukee in 1883–84. To the right of the altar is a pot-bellied Jewel-brand stove. Left of the altar is a confession booth. Above it is a four-foot wooden cross, on which is written "Rette Deine Seele Mission-1860-1887". The first part is German for "save your soul," and the last part indicates it was used for mission services even before the church was built.

The interior walls are plaster over lathe, then painted and stenciled, all remarkably original. Designs include stars, lattice, tulip shapes, and urns. On the east and west walls are fading inscriptions:

- Alle Tage deines Lebens habe Gott in deinem Herzen und hüte dich... (All the days of thy life, have God in thy mind and take heed...)
- ...je in eine Sünde zu willigen. Tob 4. (...that thou never consent to sin. Tobias 4)
- Wer euch hört, der hört mich. Wer euch verachtet, der verachtet mich. (He that heareth thee heareth me; and he that despiseth thee despiseth me.)
- Du sollst Vater und Mutter ehren. 10 Geb. (Honor thy father and thy mother. 10 Comm.)
- Fürchte den Herrn von deiner ganzen Seele und halte seine Priester in Ehren. Jes Sirach. 7:29. (With all thy soul fear the Lord, and revere His priests. Jesus Sirach. 7:29.)
- Nirgend ist ein Fehler gefährlicher als hier. St. Greg. (Nowhere is a fault more perilous than here. St. Gregory)

A caretaker's home was built nearby at the same time as the church. The first priest was Reverend Herman Grosse. Services were held monthly and initially conducted in Latin. Later the language switched to German. After WWI, services switched to English. The church remained a mission church with services held monthly until 1942. By then attendance no longer justified that schedule, so services were cut back to several times each year. Edward Bender bought the caretaker's home in 1947 and moved it. In 1960 the mission church was closed.

The cemetery across the road is backed by the wooded bluff. The earliest tombstone is from 1862. Grave markers include wrought iron crosses, simple slab markers, and modern, machine-cut stones. Names on the stones include Bethscheider, Bliven, Brylla, Conner, Conway, McKenna, Mehan, Mettel, O'Neill, Power and Unterholtzener. The German, Irish, and English names are generally grouped in different parts of the cemetery.

In 1973 Robert Jaedike bought the church for $1500, giving it to the Sauk Prairie Historical Society in 1975. Today County C still winds around the wooded bluff and between the church and cemetery. The church serves as a wedding chapel and a public museum on summer Sundays.
