= Loreto College, Mullingar =

Secondary school for girls in County Westmeath, Ireland

Loreto College

Location
- Mullingar, County Westmeath; N91 PX98; Ireland
- Coordinates: 53°31′47.462″N 7°20′46.534″W

Information
- Religious affiliation: Catholic church
- Established: 25 March 1881; 144 years ago
- Principal: Olivia Callaghan
- Enrollment: 876 (2021)
- Website: loretocollegemullingar.com
- Last updated: 19 December 2019

Loreto College is an all-girls Catholic secondary school in Mullingar, County Westmeath, Ireland. It is connected with the international group of schools served by the Sisters of Loreto.

== History ==
The school was opened in 1853 by Sister Bernadette O'Connor, a Loreto sister originally from County Sligo.

On 5 May 2011, Minister Willie Penrose officially turned over the first sod signifying the start of a major extension / refurbishment programme to take place in the Loreto College, Mullingar. Work then commenced on a new gymnasium, new office space- allowing the current office space to be turned into classrooms, new playing fields consisting of a basketball court and Astroturf, the conversion of the existing canteen into science labs and the general refurbishment of the existing school building.
