= Loretto (artist) =

London-based street artist

Loretto is a pseudonymous street artist known for his unconventional and satirical graffiti art, displayed on the streets of London. Operating anonymously, Loretto has gained attention for work combining humor, social commentary, and political satire.

== Biography ==
Details regarding Loretto's personal background remain undisclosed. Loretto's work has received media attention, including coverage in the Mail Online and New York Post. The artist also appeared on Quest Means Business, a business news program broadcast on CNN.

== Artistic style ==
Loretto employs a stencil and spray paint technique. Loretto's work appears in public spaces throughout London, where they use vibrant colours and detailed outlines to convey a recognisable style. and often features satirical depictions of political figures.

== Notable works ==
Loretto created a satirical portrayal of Queen Elizabeth II in poses including leaning against a post, wearing stockings, and smoking. Another notable mural showcased leaders like Kim Jong-Un, Donald Trump, and Vladimir Putin forming the fictional supergroup "The Psychos."

== Controversy and recognition ==
Murals depicting political figures, including former Prime Minister Theresa May, Mayor Sadiq Khan and former Labour Party leader Jeremy Corbyn, have faced removal and criticism.
