= Loreto, Switzerland =

Coordinates: 45.997722°N 8.945897°E

Loreto
- Quarter
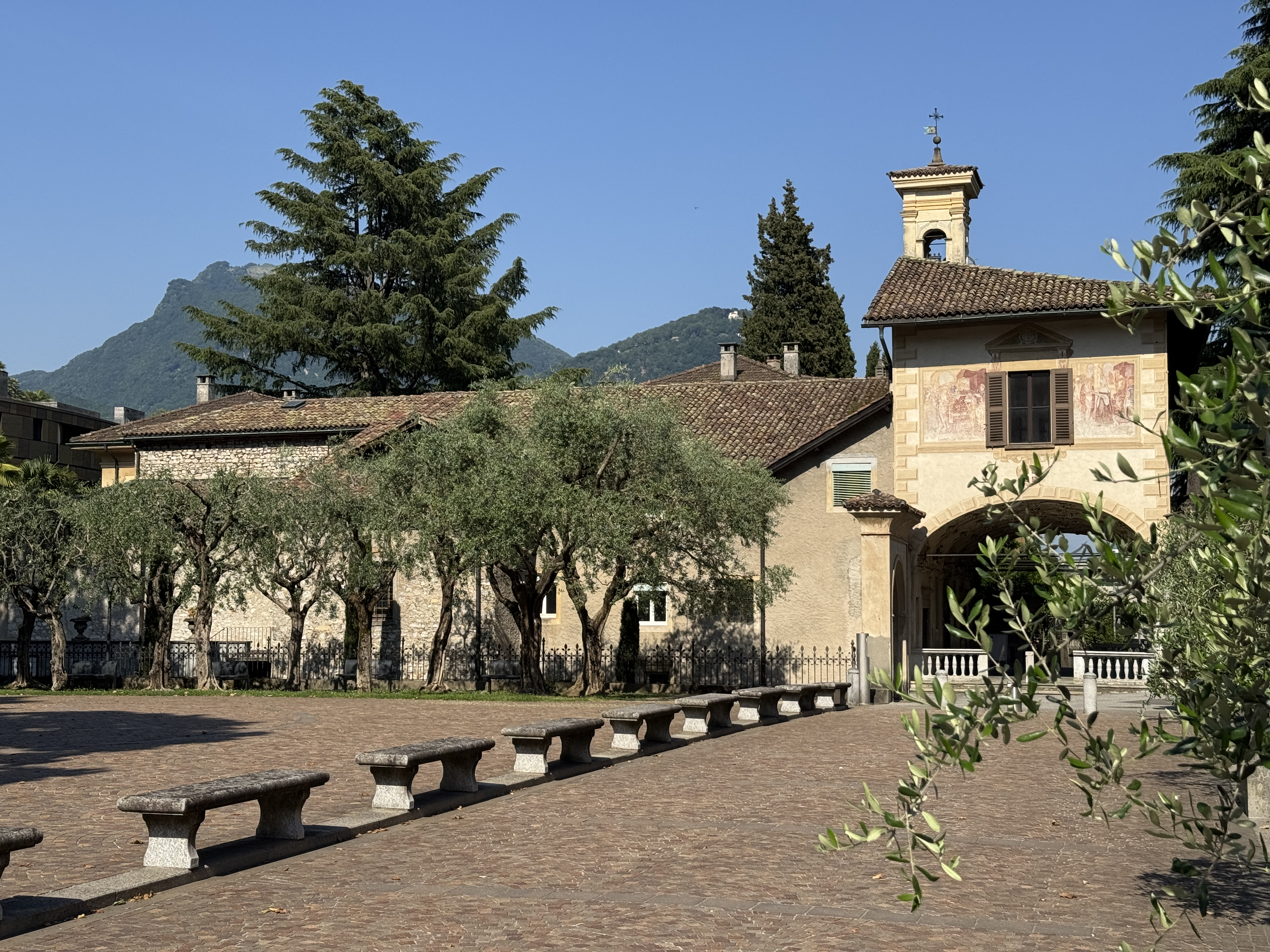

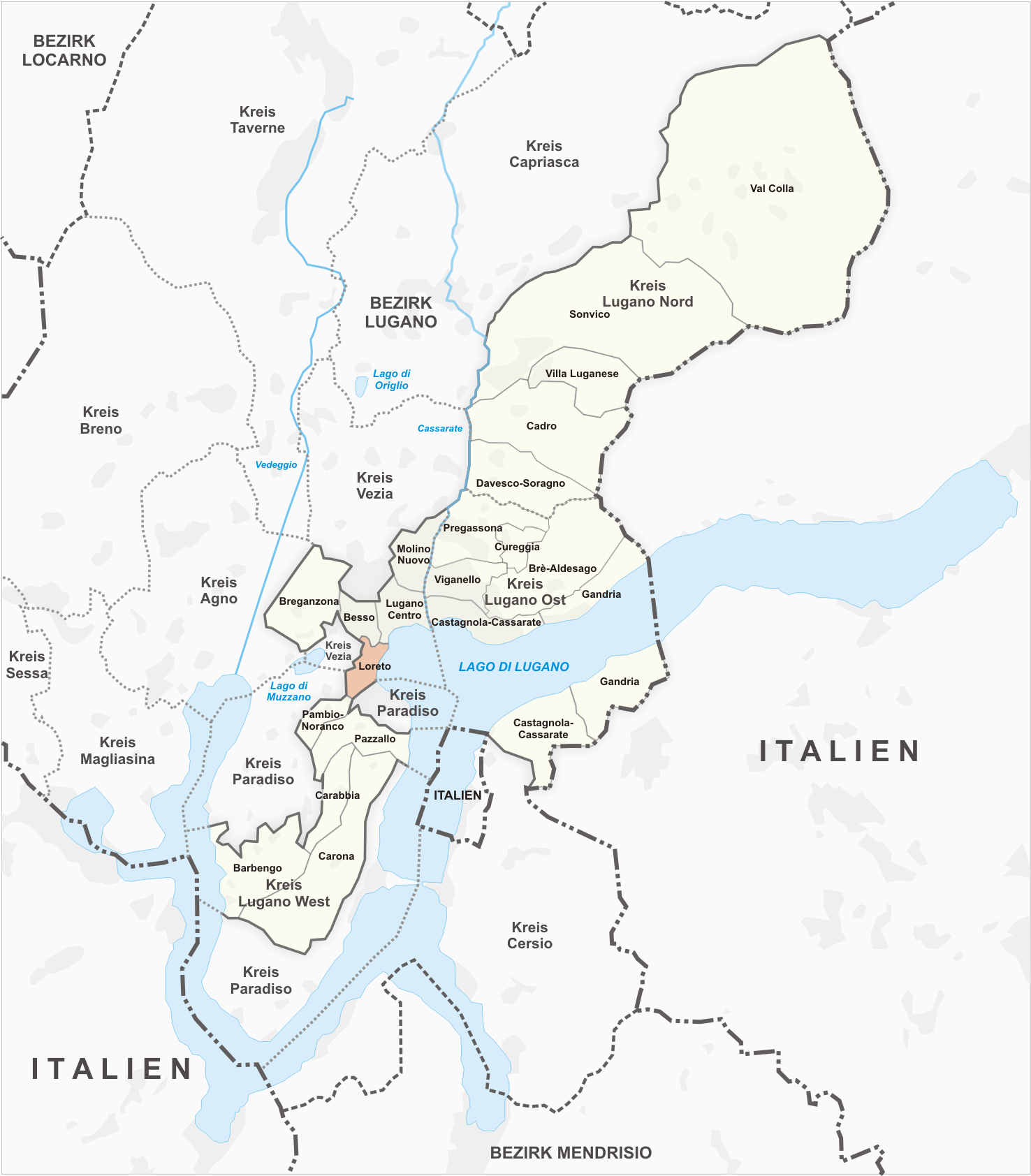
- Country: Switzerland
- Canton: Ticino
- District: Lugano
- City: Lugano

Population (2025)
  - Total: 3,120

Loreto is a quarter of the city of Lugano, in the Swiss canton of Ticino. Loreto includes the waterfront of Lake Lugano from Lugano Arte e Cultura to the border of the municipality Paradiso to the south. The quarter takes its name from the Chiesa di Santa Maria di Loreto (Lugano), a baroque-style church constructed in the 1520s. Since the latter half of the nineteenth century the area developed steadily, driven by the construction of grand hotels, villas and transportation infastructure. In 2025, it had a population of 3,120.
