= Loreto Secondary School, Navan =

Secondary school for girls in County Meath, Ireland

Loreto Secondary School, St. Michael's
- Lauretánæ Secundaria Schola, Sancte Michael scriptor

Location
- Navan, County Meath; Ireland; 53.6524°N 6.6763°W

Information
- Motto: Maria Regina Angelorum. Cruci Dum Spiro Fido (Latin for "Mary, Queen of the Angels. While I live, I believe in the Cross.")
- Denomination: Roman Catholic
- Established: 1833; 193 years ago
- Area trustee: Loreto Education Trust
- Principal: Sean Kelly
- Gender: All girls
- Enrollment: 806 (2020)
- Nickname: Loreto Navan
- Religious Order: Sisters of Loreto (Institute of the Blessed Virgin Mary)
- Patron: Dr. Michael Smith, Bishop of Meath
- Website: loretonavan.ie

Loreto Secondary School, St. Michael's, is an all-girls secondary school in the town of Navan, County Meath in Ireland. The school, which opened in 1833, is situated on the banks of the River Boyne on Convent Road. The Loreto Sisters St. Michael's Convent adjoins the main and oldest part of the school, with a day-care centre for the elderly situated at the side. There are approximately 52 staff members, including teachers, two career guidance counsellors and ancillary staff. As of 2020, there were 806 students enrolled.

== Notable alumnae ==
- Nina Carberry, jockey and Member of the European Parliament
