= Loreto (meteorite) =

Meteorite

Coordinates: 26°00′46″N 111°20′36″W

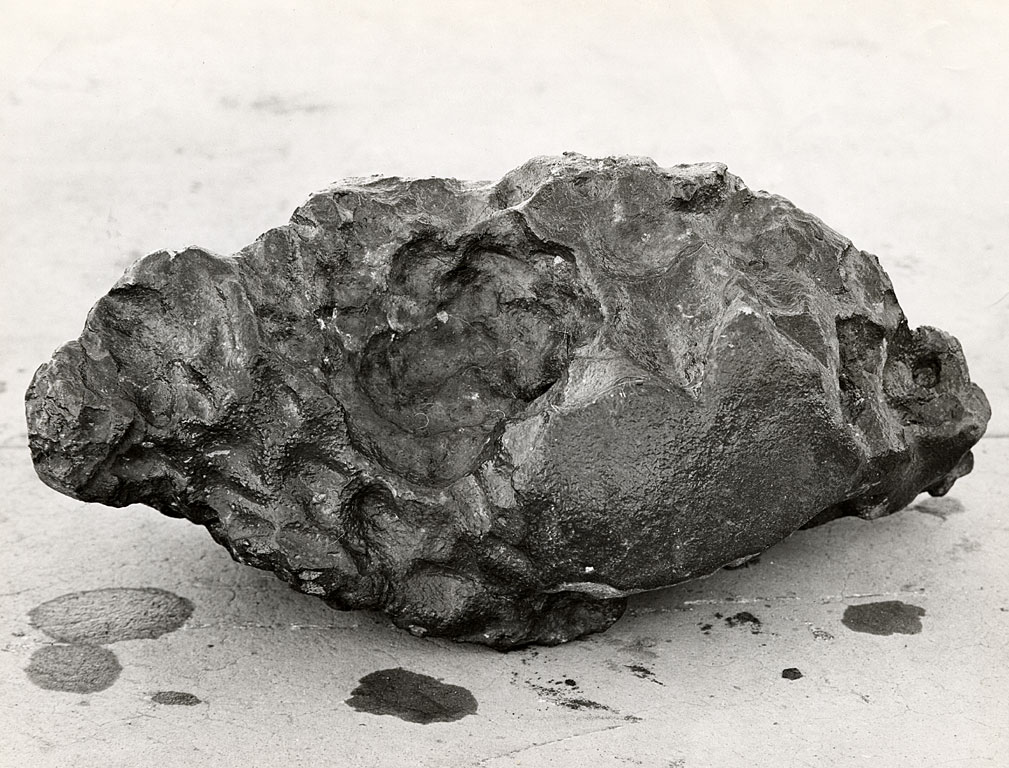
- A photograph of Loreto sent by collector Stuart H. Perry to the Smithsonian Institution.
- Type: Iron meteorite
- Country: Mexico
- Region: Baja California Sur
- Observed fall: No
- Found date: 1896
- TKW: 95 kilograms (209 lb)

The Loreto is a meteorite that was found in Baja California Sur, Mexico. It was found in 1896 and weighed approximately 95 kilograms (209 lb).

It was donated, by Stuart H. Perry, to the United States National Museum. Today, it resides in the collection of the National Museum of Natural History.

A small amount of the meteorite was distributed to other organizations, leaving NMNH with 90 kilograms (200 lb).

== See also ==
- Glossary of meteoritics
