= Loretto College School =

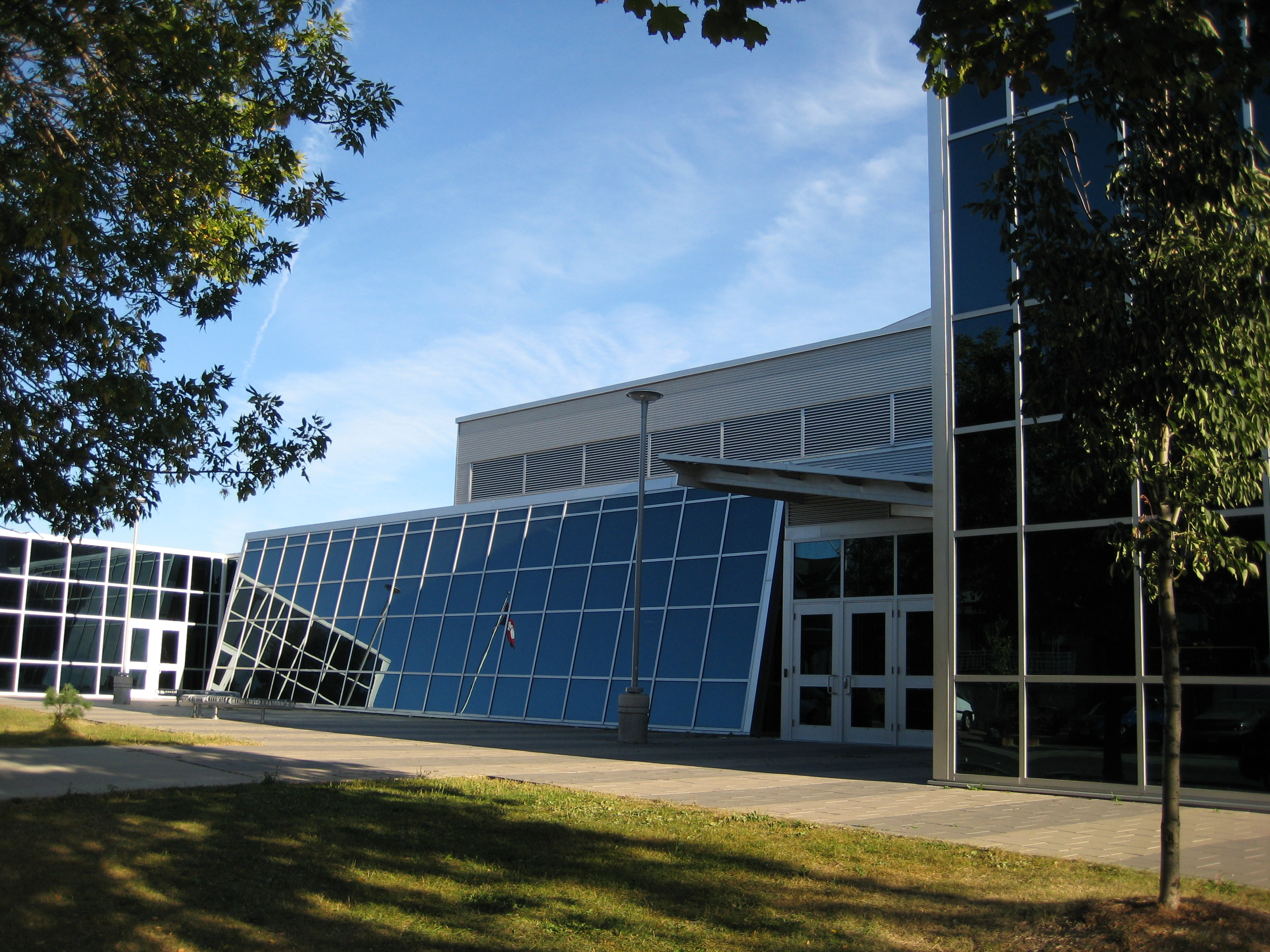

Location
- 151 Rosemount Avenue; Toronto, Ontario, M6H 2N1; Canada; 43.6756°N 79.4435°W

Information
- School type: Catholic High School
- Motto: Cruci dum Spiro Fido (Throughout My Life, I Shall Place My Hope in the Cross)
- Religious affiliations: Roman Catholic (Loretto Sisters)
- Established: September 7, 1915; 111 years ago
- School board: Toronto Catholic District School Board (Metropolitan Separate School Board)
- Superintendent: George Danfulani; Area 5
- Area trustee: Frank D'Amico; Ward 6
- School number: 511 / 728063
- Principal: Erica Wilson
- Vice Principal: Maria Filomena (Mena) Silva
- CSPC Chair: Gus Gikas
- Grades: 9-12
- Colours: Blue and White
- Mascot: Loretta
- Team name: Loretto Lightning
- Parish: St. Nicholas of Bari Catholic Church
- Specialist High Skills Major: Arts and Culture; Health and Wellness; STEAM
- Website: tcdsb.org/o/lorettocollege

Loretto College School (a.k.a. Loretto College, or Loretto), formerly the Loretto Abbey Day School and Loretto Abbey Day School and College, is a Catholic high school for girls in Toronto, Ontario, Canada.

The school is operated by the Toronto Catholic District School Board, formerly the Metropolitan Separate School Board. The institution was founded by the Loretto Sisters (Institute of the Blessed Virgin Mary) in 1915, whose founder (Blessed Mary Ward) advocated for excellent education for young women so that they might "do great things". The designated name "College" refers to the school's association with Loretto College, a component of the University of St. Michael's College, part of the University of Toronto.

== History ==
The roots of the school go back to 1847 when five Loretto Sisters from Ireland opened a boarding and day school for young Catholic women in Toronto.

The building was created in 1913 and commercial students from Bond Street moved to the "Casa", with 538 music students moved the following year. The Loretto Day School opened officially in September 1915 on Brunswick Avenue with 200 girls, boarders, and day students from Grades 1 to 13 with a few boys from Grades 1 to 3. In 1918, following the move to Brunswick from the old Abbey, the school became known as "Loretto Abbey Day School and College" before becoming "Loretto College School", although the College component moved to St. George Street in 1937. The Casa became a residence for the sisters.

The modern high school was erected and opened in September 1954. The Junior School was closed in June 1949, followed by the Boarding School in 1960 and the Secretarial Department in 1981. In 1967, the Sisters entered into an agreement with the Metropolitan Separate School Board to educate the school's Grade 9 and 10 students, while the Sisters retained control of Grades 11-13 classes.

In 1985, following the provincial extension of high school funding for the final three grades of high school, Loretto College ceased to be a private school. In 1986 LCS opened an annex on the former site of St. Dominic Savio Catholic School on Bathurst Street to accommodate overflow from the main campus.

On December 3, 1999, a fire broke out at the Brunswick building with 16 nuns escaping the blaze. The fire marked the end of an era of the Sisters living in the property. By 2001, the Loretto Sisters sold the Brunswick properties to a developer and the school was relocated on Markham Street in the former St. Peter Catholic School.

The school relocated to a new building at 151 Rosemount Avenue, the former home of Richard W. Scott (Senior) Catholic School, in September 2005. Originally, the site was shared by Bishop Francis Marrocco Catholic High School, that opened in 1986. The Brunswick building has since been converted into condominiums.

== Spiritual life ==
Students at Loretto College School take a religion course each year. The school's faith life also includes retreats, liturgies, charitable works and Catholic perspectives across the curriculum.

== Alumnae ==
- Marilyn Bell, the first person to swim across Lake Ontario
- Barbara Greene, former Member of Parliament and city councillor
- O R Melling (G.V. Whelan), author
- Beatrice Gladys Lillie, Lady Peel, actress, singer, and comedy performer

== Notable staff ==
Diane Vautour, a history teacher, was awarded the 2010 Governor General's Award for Excellence in Teaching Canadian History.

== See also ==
- Education in Ontario
- List of secondary schools in Ontario
