= John XXIII College, Perth =

John XXIII College
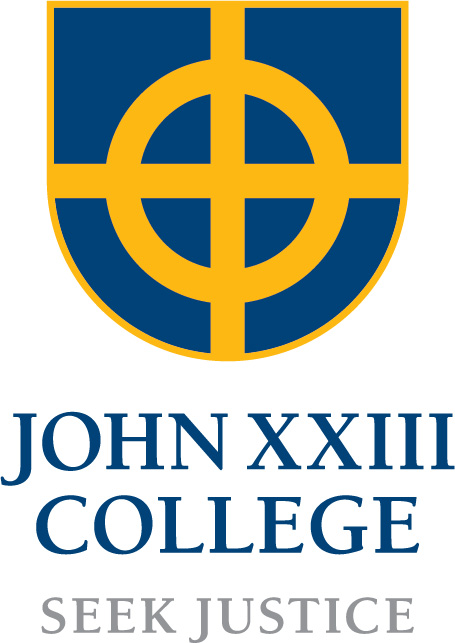

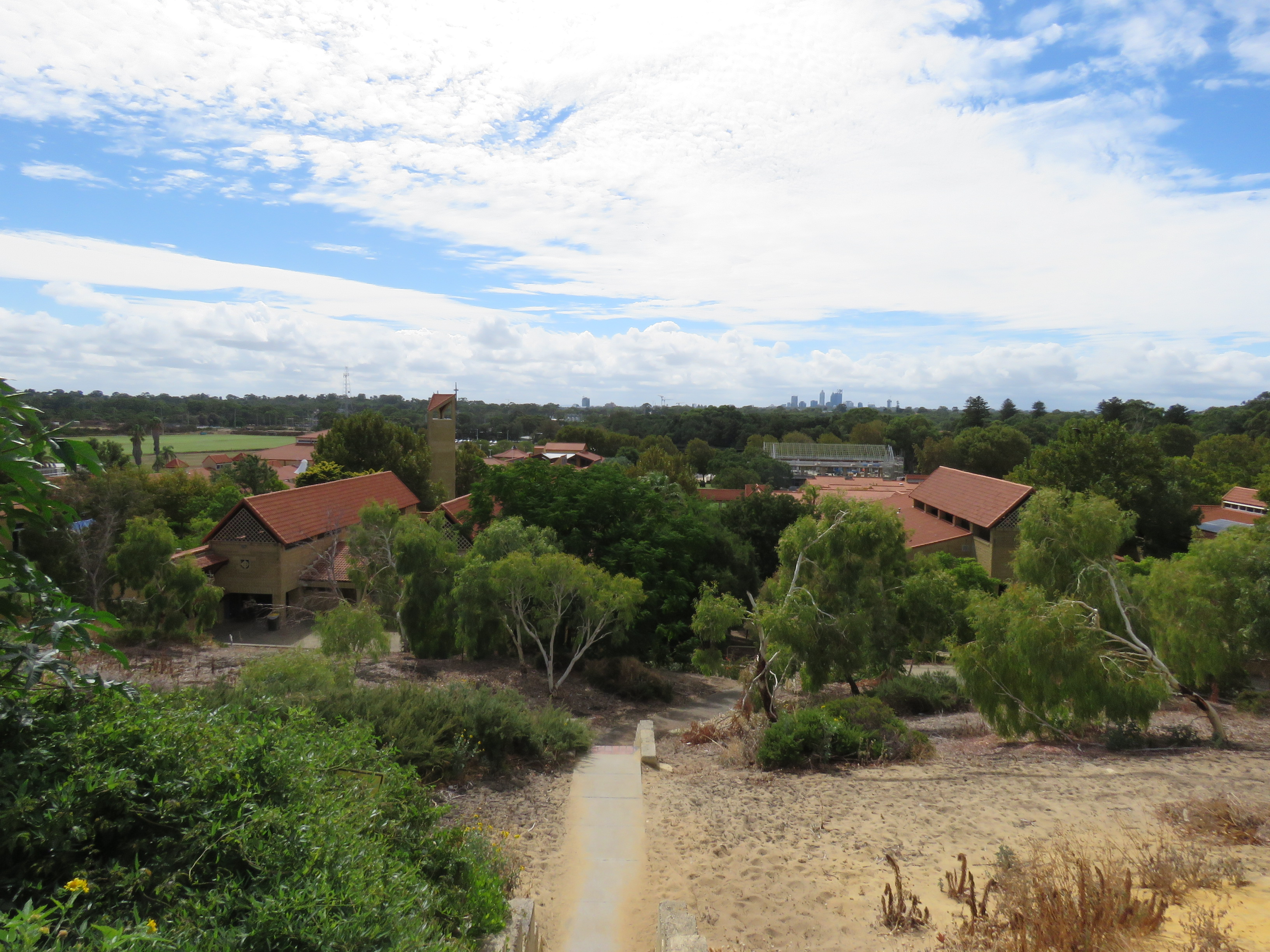
- John XXIII College seen from Swanbourne Hospital in March 2022

Location
- Mount Claremont, Western Australia; Australia; 31°57′37″S 115°47′04″E

Information
- Type: Independent, co-educational secondary school
- Motto: Seek Justice
- Denomination: Roman Catholic (Jesuit)
- Established: 1977
- Chair: Courtenay Harris
- Principal: Daniel Mahon
- Staff: 200
- Years: PK–12
- Enrolment: 1500+
- Colour: Navy-blue/yellow
- Slogan: Great minds, good hearts
- Affiliation: Jesuit and Companion Schools in Australia
- Website: www.johnxxiii.edu.au

John XXIII College is a Roman Catholic co-educational primary and secondary day school located in Mount Claremont, a western suburb of Perth, Western Australia. The school provides education from kindergarten to Year 12 students. The college is named after Pope John XXIII and operates under the authority of the Catholic Archbishop of Perth.

The college is the result of the merger in 1977 of the Jesuit Saint Louis boys school spread over different campuses (first opened in 1938) and Loreto Convent girls school (first opened in 1897). In 1986 the school was relocated to its present site in Mount Claremont.

== Academic results ==
The school has performed well in the Western Australian Certificate of Education (WACE) exams and is often rated in the top 50 schools in the state, achieving the 10th highest ATAR results in Western Australia in 2021

Year	% +75 in WACE (Note: Based on the number of Stage 3 course enrolments in the school where a WACE course score of 75 or above was achieved)	State ranking (Note: Ranking of school compared to other schools in the state)	% +65 in WACE (Note: Based on the number of Stage 3 course enrolments in the school where a WACE course score of 65 or above was achieved)	State ranking	% graduation (Note: Percentage of Year 12 cohort that graduated with a WACE certificate)	Notes
2009		37		29	98.17	
2010	16.49	21	61.13	12	100	
2011	21.11	16	59.80	11	100	
2012	19.35	15	49.29	15	99.41	
2014	15.12	22	50.57	13	99.30	

The class of 2015 had a 100% achievement of WACE, 89% of the graduating students were studying an ATAR pathway, the Median ATAR was 90.3 and 75 students achieved an ATAR in the 90s.

== School sports ==
John XXIII College offers a wide range of sports. Annual sports carnivals include athletics, cross country and swimming. John XXIII provide many sporting opportunities including rowing, swimming, rugby, athletics, football, basketball, soccer, cross country, volleyball and netball. John XXIII College participates in sporting carnivals such as Northern Associated Schools (NAS) and Associated & Catholic Colleges (ACC). Among the school's alumni is Australian swimmer and world record holder Eamon Sullivan. In 2008, John XXIII students beat two of Sullivan's school swimming records in the inter-house swimming carnival.

== House system ==
As with most Australian schools, John XXIII College utilises a house system through which students participate in inter-house activities and competitions. There are six houses at the college:

- Campion (purple)
- Koolyangarra (green)
- Loreto (blue)
- Loyola (white)
- St Louis (red)
- Ward (yellow)

== Notable alumni ==
Some of John XXIII's former students include:

- Claire Bevilacqua – Pro surfer
- Kate Chaney – Lawyer, businesswoman and politician
- Judy Davis – Actress
- Matt de Boer – Australian rules football player
- Lucy Durack – Singer and actress
- Judy Edwards – Politician
- Allan Fels – Chairman of Australian Competition and Consumer Commission
- Robert French – Former Chief Justice of the High Court of Australia
- Celia Hammond – Politician
- Roz Hammond – Actress
- Hollie Hughes – Politician
- Eileen Joyce – Pianist
- Jessica Marais – Actress
- Robert Mazza – Justice of the Supreme Court of Western Australia
- Paul Medhurst – Australian rules football player
- Kevin Parker – Tame Impala
- Katrina Porter – Paralympic athlete
- Peter Quinlan – Chief Justice of Western Australia from 2018
- Amanda Sainsbury-Salis – Scientist and author
- Eamon Sullivan – Swimmer
- John Toohey – Justice of the High Court of Australia

== Pilgrimages ==
The College benefits greatly from ongoing links with the Loreto and Jesuit orders that have enabled students to take part in pilgrimages. Year 11 students are invited to participate in the College Pilgrimage Program whereby up to 90 students spend two weeks in the following places:

- Vietnam (Ho Chi Minh City)
- India
- Timor Leste (East Timor)
- Alice Springs
- Cambodia
- Northern Territory

== Sister schools ==
John XXIII College's sister schools are:

- Loreto Normanhurst, NSW
- Loreto Kirribilli, NSW
- Loreto Nedlands, WA (permanently closed)
- Loreto Marryatville, SA
- Loreto Coorparoo, Qld
- Loreto Ballarat, Vic
- Loreto Mandeville Hall, Toorak VIC

== See also ==
- List of schools in the Perth metropolitan area
