= Loreto College, Foxrock =

Private secondary school for girls in Foxrock, Dublin, Ireland

Location
- Foxrock, Dublin 18; Ireland
- Coordinates: 53.272978°N 6.177075°W

Information
- Motto: Cruci Dum Spiro Fido (Latin for "While I breath, I trust in the cross.")
- Religious affiliation: Roman Catholic
- Established: 25 July 1887
- Enrollment: 690
- Religious order: Loreto Sisters
- Website: loretofoxrock.ie

Loreto College, Foxrock is a voluntary fee-paying Catholic secondary school under the direction of the Sisters of Loreto in Foxrock, a suburb of Dublin, Ireland. It is situated on the N11 in Dublin.

== History ==
The school was opened in 1941. The Bishop asked Mother Pauline Dunne, Superior General of Loreto, to open a junior and secondary school in Foxrock. The Sisters arrived in the house on 8 September 1941. "School began two days later. The pupil numbers were in single digits for the first few weeks, but had grown to 28 by the following spring."

Work on the construction of the chapel (now the staff room) began in January 1942. The early years were impacted by World War II, and conditions were difficult. When the architect for the chapel sought the iron girders needed for the construction, it was found that none could be sourced. He solved the problem by supporting the roof by two rows of pillars, which were considered to add to the dignity of the building.

In September 1942, the school was officially recognised as a secondary school by the Department of Education.

The kindergarten / junior school block was completed and occupied by Christmas 1942, and by May 1943, there were 50 pupils in the schools. In that year, sports began to play an important part in the curriculum of Loreto Foxrock. However, the annals record that wartime travelling conditions prevented participation in the inter-Loreto sports competitions; so friendly matches were arranged between the local schools. In 1952, the Junior Hockey Cup was the first trophy won by the school, under the captaincy of Chela Neary. The Annals record many sporting triumphs and trophies over the following years.

In the school year 1953–1954, plans were drawn up for the construction of the concert hall and the science room to the front of the building. The building now known as St. Michaels was originally built in 1966.

The annals of the school include many anecdotes about the earliest pupils, who are included by name. A number of these pupils died at very young ages from illnesses, which would now be treated successfully, given advances in medical science. One such pupil was Olga Hick, who appears in the records as the very first pupil to arrive in the new Loreto School in Foxrock. The first member of the community to die was the well-loved Mother Imelda McInerney who had been in charge of the kindergarten from its opening until her death in 1956 at the age of 37. Many past pupils still recall her care for them and her wonderful sense of humour.

== Buildings and facilities ==
The buildings on campus house the community residence, the secondary school and the Loreto Education office. The school buildings have been erected on a phased basis in response to educational needs and student population. In the 1980s, with the help of a partial grant from the Department of Education, the old prefabricated building was updated and became known as “St. Michael’s”. Following a Loreto Community contribution and fund-raising, the sports hall was added in the late 1980s. In 1999, the trustees gave the community chapel to the secondary School for development as a staff room. In response to the increasing student population in the secondary school, the trustees also agreed to give the junior school and kindergarten classrooms for use in the secondary school. In 2000, a large extension was added to the lunchroom and recreation area. Two additional classrooms and a new fire stairs were also part of this development. A new computer room was also completed.

The grounds include a floodlit astroturf hockey pitch, astroturf tennis/basketball courts and a grass play area. Bicycle and car parking areas were expanded.

== Operations and funding ==
The school is a fee-paying secondary day school, and is run by the Board of Management, which was first set up in 1990. It now has an enrollment of 684 students and provides the Transition Year option.

The current principal is Fionnula Gleeson

== Alumni ==
- Ann Louise Gilligan - theologian and LGBT campaigner
- Amy Huberman - actress
- Mary Lavin - writer
- Grace O'Flanagan - Ireland women's field hockey international and silver medallist at the 2018 Women's Hockey World Cup
