= Loreto College, Coleraine =

Loreto College Coleraine

Location
- Castlerock Road; Coleraine, County Londonderry, BT51 3JZ; Northern Ireland
- 55.1397°N 6.6898°W

Information
- Type: Grammar School
- Motto: "Cruci Dum Spiro Fido" "While I breathe I trust in the cross"
- Religious affiliation: Roman Catholic
- Established: 1930
- Specialist: Science
- Head teacher: S Gallagher
- Staff: 53
- Gender: Co-educational
- Age: 11 to 18
- Enrolment: 840
- Colour
- Publication: Loreto Lore
- Website: https://www.loretocollege.org.uk/

Loreto College(Irish: Coláiste Loreto) is a Roman Catholic grammar school situated in the Castlerock Road area of Coleraine, County Londonderry, on the north coast of Northern Ireland. Loreto College educates both girls and boys between the age of 11 and 18.

== History ==
In 1906, the Ursuline Order took control of an all-girls school, setting up a smaller boys' primary school nearby. In 1922, when the new Northern Ireland Educational Authority was set up, certain qualifications were needed to teach in secondary schools. The nuns, being French, did not have these qualifications so they decided to withdraw from Northern Ireland. The Loreto nuns in Omagh were asked to take over the schools, both primary and secondary. On August 13, 1930, four Loreto Sisters, a congregation founded by Mary Ward, arrived. The Ursulines stayed with them for two weeks to help them settle into their new home. The original four sisters - M. Rose, M. Colmcille, M. Aidan and M. Kevin - were joined by M. Peter, M. Benedict and M. Gertrude as first members of the new community. The school was later extended, and has adapted to changes in the educational system . The school became co-educational in 1977. is owned and maintained by the Loreto Education Trust. In 2005, the school celebrated its 75th anniversary, culminating in an open day including a museum, and finally Mass in St. John's Church nearby. In April 2014, after 83 years of living in the convent house attached to the school, the Loreto Sisters left as the home did not meet fire regulations.

== Facilities ==
The college was awarded over £30 million in 2022 for a substantial building of new facilities.

== Academic performance ==
The college offers instruction in a comprehensive range of subjects with departments of art and design, business studies, careers, child development, computing, drama, economics, English, English literature, geography, health and social care, history, home economics, government and politics, ICT, library, mathematics, modern languages (French, Irish and Spanish), music, PE, religious education, science (biology, chemistry and physics), technology and theatre studies.

In the 2018 Belfast Telegraph School League Table, the college was ranked 4th out of 192 schools in Northern Ireland in its A-level exam performance in 2016/17 with 92.3% of entrants being awarded A*-C grades.

In 2018 it was ranked 12th in Northern Ireland for its GCSE performance with 99.2% of its entrants in 2016/17 receiving five or more GCSEs at grades A* to C, including the core subjects English and Maths. In the 2019 League Table, 84.0% of its GCSE entrants were awarded grades of A* to C on five or more exams and the college was ranked 64 out of 188 schools.

In 2007, the school was awarded specialist school status for science and this has been celebrated in a variety of ways.

== Sport ==
The following sports are played in the school: Gaelic football, soccer, hurling, camogie, netball, basketball, hockey, volleyball, handball, and rounders. Loreto College, Coleraine has for many years achieved consistently outstanding public examination results, with pupils often attaining recognition for top scores across Northern Ireland.

== Extra-curricular ==
Activities include the Duke of Edinburgh's Award scheme, St Vincent de Paul Group, Christian Life Community (CLC), debating, choir, orchestra and quizzing. Loreto have reached several national quiz finals in recent years (UK: 2007, 2009; Ireland, 2006, 2008-9, 2011).

== Notable former pupils ==
- Monica McWilliams (born 1954) - politician and academic
- Caoimhe Archibald (born 1981) - Member of the Legislative Assembly for East Londonderry
- Barry McGoldrick (born 1985) - Gaelic footballer
- Sean Leo McGoldrick (born 1987) - Gaelic footballer
- Stephen Dooley (1991) - footballer
