= Loreto Grammar School, Omagh =

Coordinates: 54.600°N 7.309°W

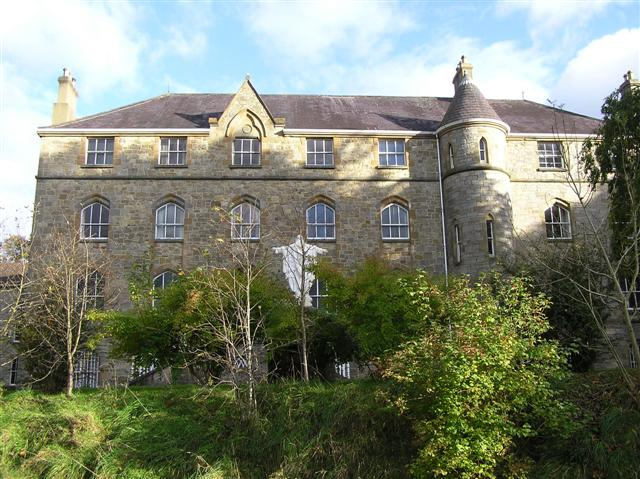
- Oldest section of the school buildings
- James Street, Omagh, BT78 1DL; Northern Ireland

Information
- Type: Grammar school
- Religious affiliation: Roman Catholic
- Established: 1855
- Principal: Susan Cullinan
- Gender: All-female
- Age: 11 to 18
- Enrolment: 900
- Colour
- Website: loretogs.com

Loreto Grammar School is a convent grammar school for girls in Omagh, County Tyrone, Northern Ireland. The teaching age range is 11–18

It is a Roman Catholic school, founded in 1855, and is now under the trusteeship of the Loreto Education Trust.

== Academics ==
In 2018, 99.2% of its entrants achieved five or more GCSEs at grades A* to C, including the core subjects English and Maths, and the school was ranked 12th out of 191 schools in Northern Ireland.

Also in 2018, 81.8% of its entrants to the A-level exam achieved A*-C grades.

== Notable alumni ==
- Sheelagh Murnaghan (1924–1993) – politician

== See also ==
- List of schools in Northern Ireland
