= Loreto College, St Albans =

Loreto College

Location
- Hatfield Road; St Albans, Hertfordshire, AL1 3RQ; England; 51°45′10″N 0°19′46″W

Information
- Type: Academy
- Religious affiliation: Roman Catholic
- Established: 1922
- Founder: Institute of the Blessed Virgin Mary
- Department for Education URN: 138106 Tables
- Ofsted: Reports
- Chair: Mark Healy
- Head teacher: Lucy Thompson
- Gender: Girls (coeducational Sixth Form)
- Age: 11 to 18
- Enrolment: 1000~
- Houses: Truth; Joy; Justice; Freedom; Sincerity
- Colours: Navy, maroon and musty yellow
- Website: http://www.loreto.herts.sch.uk/

Loreto College is a Roman Catholic secondary school and sixth form for girls located near the centre of St Albans, Hertfordshire, England. It achieved Specialist Status in the Humanities in 2005 and became an academy in August 2012.

The college enrolls around 1000 pupils, including 190 in the sixth form, with many pupils coming from a wide geographical area. It expanded to 5 forms of entry (from 4 in previous years) in September 2007.

In 2006, 2009 and 2013, the college was rated "Outstanding" by Ofsted, achieving grade one in all categories.

== History ==
Founded by the Loreto Sisters, the college had just seven pupils when it first opened in 1922. The Sisters had bought a building called "The Elms" to use as a convent before opening the school.

=== Grammar school ===
During the Second World War, the gymnasium become an air-raid shelter and makeshift dormitories by night. American soldiers billeted in St Albans used the school's hockey pitch to train.

=== Comprehensive ===
It turned comprehensive in 1978.

=== New Headteacher ===
Mrs Marie Lynch, after 22 years as headteacher, retired in March and new headteacher Mrs Lucy Thompson took over after the Easter Holidays in April.

== Notable former pupils ==
- Siobhán Fahey (b. 1958) - singer with 1980s pop group Bananarama (second-highest selling British female group, with over 40 million records, after the Spice Girls), then Shakespears Sister in the 1990s
- Claire Ward (b. 1972) - Labour MP from 1997 to 2010 for Watford
- Sally Bretton (nee Davis) (b. 1980) - actress
- Shona McGarty (b. 1991) - actress who plays Whitney Dean in EastEnders
