= Loreto Convent Lucknow =

Coordinates: 26.8367°N 80.9515°E

Loreto Convent
- Lucknow, UP; India

Information
- Type: Private
- Motto: Maria Regina Angelorum Cruci Dum Spiro Fido
- Established: 1872; 154 years ago
- Founder: Sisters of Loreto
- Affiliation: Council for the Indian School Certificate Examinations (CISCE)
- Website: www.lucknowloreto.com

Loreto Convent, Lucknow is an educational institution founded in 1872 and located in Lucknow, the capital of Uttar Pradesh, India. Loreto Convent is under the management of the Sisters of the Institute of the Blessed Virgin Mary, usually known as the Loreto Sisters. Loreto also has a sister school in Lucknow by the name of St. Agnes' Loreto Day School.

The primary aim of Loreto Convent Lucknow is to educate Catholic children, but children from other religions are also accepted without any discrimination. The pupils of this institution call themselves 'Loretoites'.

== History ==
Loreto was founded in 1616 by an English woman, Mary Ward (1585–1645). It pioneered a new type of religious life, which undertook the education of girls as its main work. The 18th century saw the spread in development of the institute in England and Europe. It was introduced into Ireland by Frances Teresa Ball, who in 1821 established the first House of the Irish branch there. She called it Loreto, the name by which all subsequent foundations are known.

The Loreto Sisters came to India in 1841 and established schools in Northern India. The aim of the school is to give its pupils a sound moral education while devoting special attention to their intellectual, social and physical development.

In 1872, a group of seven Sisters led by Mother Joseph Hogan, arrived in Lucknow. They came from Darjeeling at the invitation of Rev. Paul Tosy, the Catholic Bishop of Lucknow. They were given a welcome by the Parish Priest, Father Lewis, who conducted them to the house he had secured for them adjoining to the Church, in what is now Shahnajaf Road. It was in this House that the first Loreto School started in Lucknow on 4 November 1872.

The earlier days in Lucknow were of great privation as they had few possessions and the heat was tiring for the Sisters, dressed as they were in heavy black habits. In 1873 the first boarder arrived, Amy Glynn, and when others joined, Mother Joseph knew that the little Convent was far too small. In April of the same year, she secured a large house which was later to become the Royal Hotel, but which was to be Loreto Convent for eight years.

For the transport of the children Mother Joseph designed, and had built, an 'omnibus', the first to be seen in Lucknow. In 1880, the present convent, then known as the Cantonment Hotel, was purchased. The grounds once formed part of the Nawab of Oudh's hunting grounds. Later, wings were added to accommodate classrooms and dormitories, but in 1915 the northern part of the building suffered very seriously during the floods of that year, and the Nuns were compelled to spend entire nights under umbrellas. Arches gave way and the roof of the Chapel collapsed crushing every priedieu and chair under its weight but the Sisters escaped death. After this the northern part of the building had to be pulled down and the present handsome edifice was built.

== Houses ==
There are four houses - Ball (red), Hart (green), Hogan (yellow), and Ward (blue). Ward house is dedicated to the foundress of Loreto worldwide, Mary Ward. Ball house is dedicated to Teresa Ball. Hart house is dedicated to Mother Delphine Hart. Hogan house is dedicated to Mother Joseph Hogan.

== Alumni ==
- Sumona Chakravarti, actress
- Laxmi Singh, first woman police commissioner of U.P.
- Seema Mustafa, journalist
- Kanika Kapoor, singer
- Parveen Talha, Padma Shri
- Aparna Yadav, politician
- Supriya Shrinate, politician
