= St. Agnes' Loreto Day School =

The Loreto Crest

St. Agnes' Loreto Day School, Lucknow, India, is a Catholic Institution under the management of The Lucknow Loreto Educational Society - represented by the sisters of the Institute of the Blessed Virgin Mary (Loreto Sisters). The school is recognized by the Secondary Education Department of Uttar Pradesh (Anglo-Indian Board) and affiliated to the Council for the Indian School Certificate Examinations. It is a school up to senior secondary level.

== School ==
The patroness of the school is Saint Agnes. The school is situated on Station Road, Lucknow, India.

The school premises accommodate about 1200 students. The school has a library, laboratories and a playground. It has an outreach school called "Pushpa Vidyalaya" for the underprivileged on its premises. The school is affiliated to the ICSE council. Students take their exams at the end of February.

The school has four houses - Charity (red), Hope (green), Joy (blue) and Peace (yellow). House members participate in events all through the year in inter house competitions including elocution, singing, debates, quizzes, basketball, throw ball, kho-kho and other sports.

The school participates in the ASISC meets held every year and has won Junior and senior basketball tournaments, secured first position in shotput, runner up in 3.5 km marathons and won various medals for English and Science Olympiad.

The Literary Club from the School organizes the "Literary Fest" known as "Boulevard" annually, which receives participation from schools across the city for various competitions held throughout the day.

== The crest ==
The crest is surmounted by the words "Maria Regina Angelorum" which indicates the patronage of Our Lady, Queen of Angels. The emblem's symbols mean:

- The Cross - sign of salvation
- The Sacred Heart - source of the love of Jesus for each person
- The heart of Mary - our human model and inspiration
- The anchor - a symbol of hope

This symbolism is summed up in the final scroll: "Cruci dum Spiro fido" - "Throughout my life, I shall place my hope in the cross".
