= Loreto Convent, Tara Hall, Shimla =

Loreto Convent, Tara Hall
- Loteto Convent Crest

Location
- Kaithu (Tara Hall), Shimla, Himachal Pradesh; India; 31.1105°N 77.1642°E

Information
- Type: Catholic school
- Motto: Maria Regina Angelorum Cruci Dum Spiro Fido
- Established: 1892; 134 years ago
- School district: Shimla
- Principal: Mrs. Reetu Khanna Sharma
- Staff: 75
- Enrollment: 1835
- Colours: Blue & Grey
- Affiliation: CBSE
- Website: www.loretoshimla.org

Loreto Convent, Tara Hall is an English-medium high school located in Upper Kaithu, Shimla, Himachal Pradesh, India. The school is run by the Loreto Education Society.

== Tradition ==
Loreto Convent, Tara Hall belongs to the worldwide family of the Institute of the Blessed Virgin Mary, also known as Loreto, which was founded by an English woman, Mary Ward. Loreto Sisters and the Loreto Associates are involved in various ministries in every continent, carrying forward Mary Ward's vision of Integrity, Justice, Freedom and Love as essential qualities for any person. She desired that women in particular find their rightful place in the world and society in which they live, becoming people of reflection and discernment in making choices, and learning to "refer all things to God". Developing sincere and right relationships was central to her way. Mary Ward also emphasised the need for deep joy, or ‘felicity’.

Loreto Convent, Tara Hall, Shimla is one of 15 Loreto schools in India. It is an English medium high school for girls, managed by the Shimla Loreto Educational Society. The school is a day school, affiliated with the Central Board of Secondary Education (CBSE), Delhi and has classes from Nursery to Class XII. Until 2010, the school was affiliated to the ICSE Board. The school has about 50 staff members with more than 1000 students. Tara Hall gets its name from a building of the same name in Ireland.

The school is divided into three wings: Junior School, Middle School and Senior School. The school campus is one of the largest in Shimla and features large accommodations and four playgrounds.

== History ==
The Loreto Sisters came to Shimla in 1892 with a view to provide good quality education for girls in the hills. After purchasing the twin properties of Tara Hall and Bellevue, the sisters established themselves on the present site on 30.11.1895. Soon after, to cater to the needs of the underprivileged, St. Joseph's School was opened in the vicinity. In 1904, Tara Hall and St. Joseph's were amalgamated. In 1946, the Day School at Willows Bank on the Mall, known as Loreto Chalet Day was opened. Darbhanga House was procured from the Maharaja of Darbhanga in March 1964, where now the new School Building stands.

In 1913, the Cambridge Exams were introduced and in 1916 the school secured first place in Punjab in the High School Examination. In 1992, the School celebrated its centenary year.

From 1995 for 13 years the school was under the management of the Sacred Heart Sisters, but in 2008 the Loreto Sisters returned to Shimla. In 2010 the School changed over to the CBSE Board and Classes 11 & 12 was introduced.

== Sections ==
The School is divided into two wings. The Junior Wing consists of classes from Nursery to Fifth and the Senior Wing Consists of classes from Sixth to Twelfth in the two buildings, Belle Vue and Tara Hall. Facilities include a large assembly room and laboratories for physics, chemistry, biology, and computers.
