= Loreta (given name) =

- Gender: Female

Loreta is a feminine given name. People bearing the name Loreta include:

- Loreta (1911–1998), Iranian actress
- Loreta Anilionytė (born 19??), Lithuanian philosopher, writer and translator
- Loreta Graužinienė (born 1963), Lithuanian politician
- Loreta Gulotta (born 1987), Italian fencer
- Loreta Kullashi (born 1999), Swedish footballer
- Loreta Janeta Velázquez (1842–1923), Cuban-American who masqueraded as a male Confederate soldier during the American Civil Wa
