= Sisters of Loreto =

Catholic religious congregation

Loreto Sisters
- Institute of the Blessed Virgin Mary
- Abbreviation: IBVM
- Formation: 27 September 1609; 417 years ago
- Type: Catholic religious order
- Headquarters: Casa Generalizia Di Loreto, Rome, Italy
- Superior general: Carmel Swords
- Key people: Mary Ward; Frances Mary Teresa Ball
- Parent organization: Roman Catholic Church
- Staff: 703
- Website: Institute of the Blessed Virgin Mary

The Institute of the Blessed Virgin Mary, whose members are commonly known as the Loreto Sisters, is a Catholic religious congregation of women dedicated to education. It was founded in Saint-Omer by an Englishwoman, Mary Ward, in 1609. The congregation takes its name from the Marian shrine at Loreto in Italy where Ward used to pray. Ward was declared Venerable by Pope Benedict XVI on 19 December 2009. The Loreto Sisters use the initials IBVM after their names.

Although education was its primary work, today the congregation is engaged in a wide variety of ministries: literacy programmes, spiritual direction, counselling, managing shelters for homeless women as well as several aspects of the movement for greater justice and peace in the world. The Loreto Sisters operate some 150 schools worldwide, educating over 70,000 pupils.

== Foundation ==
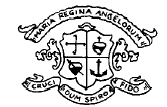
Loreto School crest

Ward was born in Mulwith, North Yorkshire, in 1585. She entered a monastery of Poor Clares at Saint-Omer in the then Spanish Netherlands as a lay sister in 1606, and the following year founded a new monastery of the Order specifically for English women at nearby Gravelines. Mary Ward was inspired by the Spiritual Exercises of Ignatius of Loyola (referred to as Ignatian spirituality). She had a vision for a different, new and modern mode of religious life for women. She envisioned women living a life in companionship and discernment, inspired by the Gospel and engaging with the world without the constraints of the traditional cloister, nor an established 'rule' placing them under the governance of the local bishop. These ideas contradicted the norms established by the Council of Trent and presented great difficulty for the leadership of the Church of that period.

Ward also believed that women were equal to men in intellect and should be educated accordingly. She travelled through Europe, mainly on foot, establishing schools in Belgium, Bavaria, Austria and Italy. Houses were founded in Angers, Cologne, Rome, Paris, and the Netherlands. A novitiate was established in Liège. The circumstances of the time and the widespread suspicion of Jesuits did not allow her to succeed with the foundation of a religious institute according to her vision. Indeed, although the Institute experienced significant success after its foundation in 1609, it was suppressed in 1631.

== Development ==
On the suppression of Mary Ward's first congregation, styled by its opponents the "Jesuitesses", a greater number of the members returned to the world or entered other religious orders. A certain number, however, who desired still to live in religion under the guidance of Ward, were sheltered with the permission of Pope Urban VIII in the Paradeiser Haus, Munich, by the Elector of Bavaria, Maximilian I. The Institute continued to survive mainly in Germany, Austria, and England, but had no official status as a religious congregation and nor official title. Gradually it came to be known on the European continent as "the English Ladies". Some of the younger members were transferred at the pope's desire to Rome, there to live with Mary Ward and be trained by her in the religious life. Her work, therefore, was not destroyed, but reconstituted with certain modifications of detail.

In 1639, with letters of introduction from Pope Urban to Queen Henrietta Maria, Mary returned to England and established herself in London. In 1642 she journeyed northward with her household and established a convent at Heworth, near York, where she died in 1645. It was not until 1703 that what is termed the Second Institute received papal approval for its rule from the then pope, Clement IX, and then canonical recognition as a religious institute by Pope Pius IX.

=== Bar Convent ===
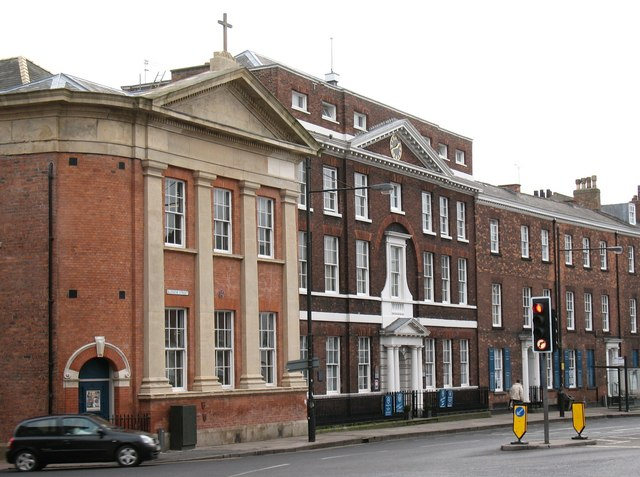
Bar Convent

In 1669, Frances Bedingfeld, superior of the mother house of the order in Munich, went to England at the request of Queen Catherine of Braganza, wife of Charles II, to establish a house in London. With a group of the English members, she set up a school for young women, first at St. Martin's Lane, then at Hammersmith. In England, she wore secular garb, and was known as Mrs. Long.

From this community, she founded Bar Convent in York in 1677 at the invitation of Sir Thomas Gascoigne. This was the first convent to be opened in England since the dissolution of the monasteries in 1536. A boarding school for Catholic girls was followed in 1699 by a free day school. Suspected of harboring Catholic priests, both houses experienced frequent harassment by local magistrates. One of the sisters of the Bar Convent was Mother Mary Loyola, an internationally bestselling author of Catholic books.

=== Ireland ===
In the early 19th century, the Loreto sisters developed as a distinct community in Ireland. Under the guidance of Sister Frances Mary Teresa Ball, Mary Ward's Institute developed in and from Ireland. Their role in developing education was central to their work, including the advancement of women in third-level education under the guidance of such superiors as Mother Mary Eucharia Ryan. In 1841, Sister Delphine Hart began the foundation in India. Foundations followed in Mauritius, England, Spain, South Africa, Kenya, Canada, the US and Peru.

=== North America and beyond ===
At the invitation of Bishop Michael Power of Toronto, five Loreto Sisters under Mother Teresa Ellen Dease arrived in the city in 1847 and founded their first school. Since the 1920s their motherhouse has been at Loretto Abbey (Hoggs Hollow), which housed a girls' secondary school: Loretto Abbey Catholic Secondary School. In 1987 management of the school was turned over to the Toronto Catholic District School Board. The Sisters also founded Loretto College School on Brunswick Avenue in 1915 and started a college and residence for women at St. Michael's College in the University of Toronto. The sisters also established many other schools across Canada, both at the elementary and secondary levels.

In 1880, the first community was established in the United States at Joliet, Illinois. In 1892 the IBVMs expanded their ministry into the city of Chicago and suburbs. Because of the difficulties in overseas communication and the different directions of the North American versus European education systems, the Canadian and United States communities suggested that a North American Generalate would best serve the needs of the times, and as a result, a North American Branch was officially created in 1881.

The Loreto Sisters arrived in Australia in 1875 in response to a request by the Bishop of Ballarat, Bishop O'Connell. The group from Ireland, led by Mother Gonzaga Barry, set up a convent in Ballarat, Victoria and their first school, Loreto College, Ballarat, was originally known as "Mary's Mount". In New South Wales in 1892 a day school was established in Randwick, and in 1897 Loreto Normanhurst began as a boarding school. The Randwick day school moved to Milson's Point in 1901 to begin what is now known as Loreto Kirribilli. The IBVM in Australia also has schools in Brisbane (Loreto College, Coorparoo), Adelaide (Loreto College, Marryatville), Melbourne (Loreto Mandeville Hall) and Perth (Loreto Nedlands Primary School).

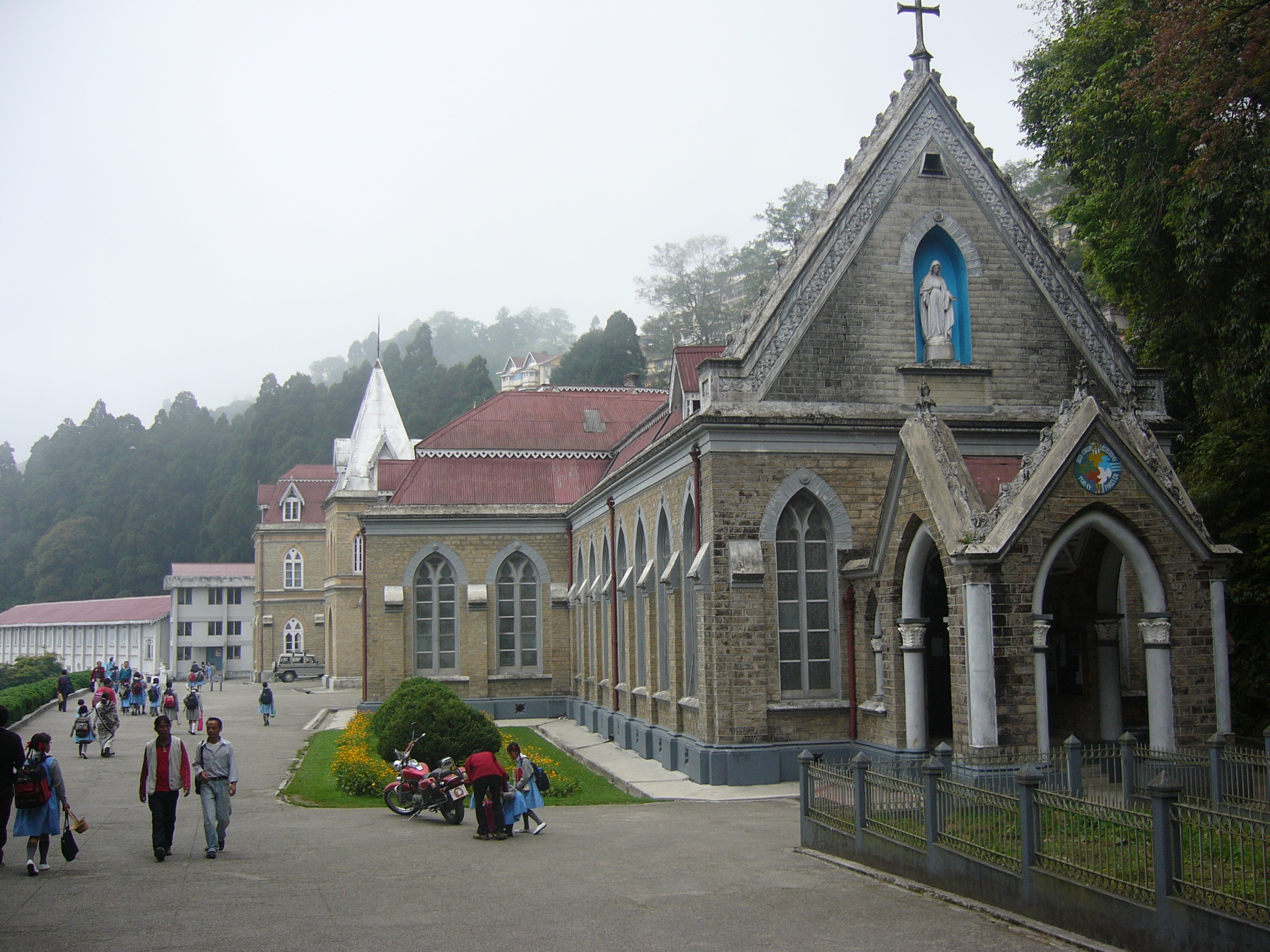
Loreto Convent, Darjeeling India, established in 1846

The 19th century saw the establishment of Loreto schools and colleges in India which became some of the most highly regarded places of education for women. The same century saw sisters from Ireland establishing a mission in South Africa in 1878. The first years of the 20th century (1904) saw the establishment of a convent in Spain by the Sisters who had a convent in Gibraltar.

Mother Teresa was part of the congregation from 1928 till 1950, during which she founded the Missionaries of Charity in Calcutta.

== Today ==
Today, sisters of the institute are found worldwide. It had historically been divided into three main groups known as the Roman Branch, the Irish Branch and the North American Branch. This situation changed in September 2003, when the Sisters of the Irish and North American Branches voted to reunite. From this, confirmed by papal decree, a new entity has been forged, now referred to as The Loreto Branch. The Roman Branch received permission from the Holy See to change its name, to reflect more closely Mary Ward's vision of a Jesuit order for women. The Roman Branch is now Congregatio Jesu or the Congregation of Jesus.

In Ireland, the Sisters run a number of day-schools for girls, and until recently ran a girls' boarding school at Rathfarnham, Dublin.

The Sisters established a number of girls' schools in England and Northern Ireland, although a number have gone coeducational. Most have joined the state sector with many run as private schools under the trusteeship of the order. Loreto High School in Chorlton, Manchester is the first Loreto school in the country to be coeducational from its inception.

The South African Province has apostolates in Pretoria, Witbank and Cape Town all of which focus on marginalised women; the Sisters also have a mission in Zambia which was established in 2006.

Like the Sisters in other provinces, those of the Spanish Province, though small in number, work primarily with disadvantaged women and children.

The Sisters of the Australian Province work in Aboriginal welfare, rural communities and care for the aged as well as having outreach in Vietnam and East Timor. There are seven Loreto Colleges spread across five states, the oldest being the school in Ballarat, Victoria.

In North America, the Sisters have communities in Texas, California, Arizona, Illinois, Michigan, Wisconsin and throughout Canada. Although the North American Sisters are involved in many aspects of education, they are also involved in many community outreach programs. This includes Mercy Home for Boys and Girls (Chicago), Marianjoy Rehabilitation Hospital (Wheaton), Pillars Community Services (Hickory Hills), the Loreto Center (Wheaton) and Wellspring Women's Center (Sacramento).

In South America, the Congregation of Jesus has three private schools in Brazil (Instituto de Educação Beatíssima Virgem Maria – IEBVM, Colégio Santa Maria and Colégio Mary Ward) and three schools in Chile. The Brazilian Sisters often go on missionary travels to Piauí, one of the poorest states in Brazil.

== Schools (selection) ==
=== Australia ===
- St Mary's College, Victoria
- Loreto College Ballarat, Victoria
- Loreto College Coorparoo, Queensland
- Loreto College Marryatville, South Australia
- Loreto Kirribilli, New South Wales
- Loreto Mandeville Hall, Toorak, Victoria
- Loreto Nedlands Primary School, Western Australia
- Loreto Normanhurst, New South Wales
- Loreto Convent, Claremont, Western Australia (merged to form John XXIII College)

=== Canada ===
- Loretto Abbey, Toronto
- Loretto College School, Toronto
- Mary Ward Catholic Secondary School, Toronto

=== India ===
- Loreto Convent, Darjeeling
- Loreto Convent, Tara Hall, Shimla
- Loreto Convent School, Delhi
- Loreto Convent Lucknow
- Loreto Schools, Kolkata
- St. Agnes' Loreto Day School, Lucknow
- St. Mary's Convent High School, Mulund
- Loreto Convent, Asansol
- Loreto Convent, Shillong

=== Ireland ===
- Loreto High School Beaufort, Rathfarnham, Dublin
- Loreto Abbey, Dalkey, Dublin
- Loreto College, Cavan, Cavan
- Loreto College, Foxrock, Dublin
- Loreto College, Mullingar, County Westmeath
- Loreto College, St Stephen's Green, Dublin
- Loreto Secondary School Kilkenny
- Loreto Secondary School, St. Michael's, Navan, Meath,

=== United Kingdom ===
==== England ====
- Loreto College, St Albans
- Loreto Sixth Form College, Manchester
- Loreto Grammar School, Altrincham
- Loreto Preparatory School, Altrincham
- Loreto High School, Chorlton
- St Mary's School, Ascot
- St Mary's School, Cambridge
- St Mary's School, Shaftesbury

==== Northern Ireland ====
- Loreto College, Coleraine
- Loreto Grammar School, Omagh

==== Gibraltar ====
- Loreto Convent School

=== Mauritius ===
- Loreto College of Port Louis, Mauritius
- Loreto College of Rose-Hill, Mauritius
- Loreto College of Saint Pierre, Mauritius
- Loreto College of Quatre-Bornes, Mauritius

=== Kenya ===
- Loreto High School, Limuru, Kenya
- Loreto Convent Valley Road, Bishops Road, Kenya
- Loreto High School, Matunda, Kenya
- Loreto Convent Matunda, Eldoret, Kenya

=== South Africa ===
- Loreto Primary School, Strand, South Africa
- Loreto Convent School, Pretoria, South Africa

=== South Sudan ===
- Loreto Primary School – Rumbek, South Sudan
- Loreto Girls Secondary School – Rumbek, South Sudan
- Loreto Primary Health Care Unit – Rumbek, South Sudan

== See also ==
- Mother Teresa
- Congregation of Jesus
