= Kenworthy =

Kenworthy is a surname. Notable people with the surname include:

- Alexandra Kenworthy (born 1932), American voice actress
- Anne Kenworthy, American academic administrator
- Bill Kenworthy (1886–1950), American baseball player
- Christina Kenworthy-Browne, British Roman Catholic nun and historian
- Christopher Kenworthy, Australian writer and film director
- David Kenworthy, 11th Baron Strabolgi (1914–2010), English politician
- Dick Kenworthy (1941–2010), American baseball player
- Duncan Kenworthy (born 1949), British film producer
- Esther Kenworthy Waterhouse (1857–1944), British artist
- Gus Kenworthy (born 1991), American freestyle skier
- John Kenworthy (1883–1940), English aviation engineer and aircraft designer
- Joseph Kenworthy, 10th Baron Strabolgi (1886-1953), British politician
- Mary-Anne Kenworthy (born 1956), Australian brothel owner
- Max Kenworthy, British musician
- Roger Kenworthy (born 1971), Australian rugby league footballer
- Shirra Kenworthy (born 1943), Canadian figure skater
- Stuart Kenworthy, British comedy writer
- Tony Kenworthy (born 1958), English former footballer

== See also ==
- Kenworth (disambiguation)
