= Frances Bedingfeld =

Frances Bedingfeld, I.B.V.M. (1616–1704) led the first foundation in England of the Institute of the Blessed Virgin Mary, better known as the Sisters of Loreto, which had been founded by the Venerable Mary Ward. In 1677, Bedingfeld founded Bar Convent in York, the oldest surviving Roman Catholic convent in England and also the first Roman Catholic School for Girls in Britain ( Bar Convent School For Girls).

== Life ==
Frances was the daughter of Francis and Katherine Fortescue Bedingfeld. Born in Norfolk, England, in 1616, she came from a recusant family which had remained Roman Catholic through the Reformation. She and her 11 sisters all entered religious orders. Sent to the continent for her education due to the Penal Laws then in effect, Bedingfeld enrolled at the school run by the Institute of the Blessed Virgin Mary in Munich, then in the Electorate of Bavaria, known there as the "English Ladies". She later entered the Institute herself in Rome and was professed in September 1633 in the church of Santa Maria Maggiore. She later became the superior of the mother house of the order in Munich.

After spending a number of years teaching at the school, in 1669 Bedingfeld was sent back to England due to a request of Queen Catherine of Braganza to found a school of the Institute in London. With a group of other English Sisters, she set up a school for young women, first at St Martin's Lane, with the support of the Queen. Once back in England, due to continued persecution, she wore a plain gray dress and used the alias of "Mrs Long". Upon the death of Charles II, finding their tenure so near to the court to be rather insecure, Frances Bedingfeld obtained, with the help of the Queen Dowager, a large house at Hammersmith with a spacious garden.

== Bar Convent ==
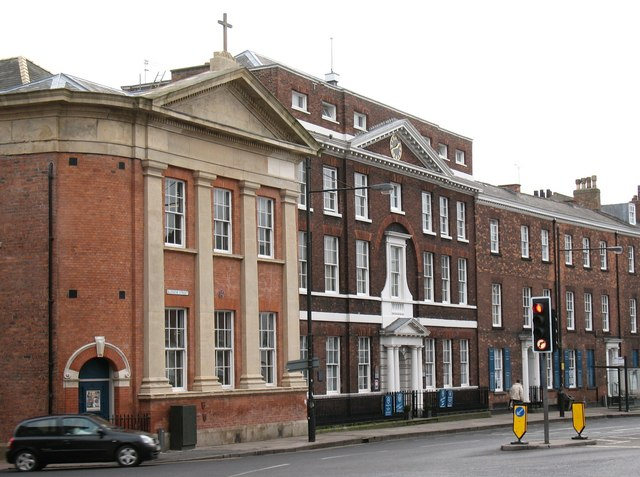
Bar Convent Exterior

From this community, she founded Bar Convent in York in 1677, at the invitation of Sir Thomas Gascoigne. This was the first Convent to be opened in England after the dissolution of Monasteries in 1536 by Henry VIII. First they set up a boarding school for Catholic girls, and this was followed in 1699 by a free day school. Both houses continued despite frequent harassment by local authorities for their ties to the Catholic Church, being suspected of harboring Catholic priests. Bedingfeld supervised both communities until 1686, when she settled in York.

Bedingfeld's family connections often helped her to avoid major punishment, even though the community endured repeated searches and destruction of their house. Bedingfeld was arrested three times: London (1674), York (1679), and in 1694, she and her great-niece, Mother Dorothy Pastor Bedingfeld, were summoned before a magistrate and briefly committed to the gaol at Ouse Bridge in York. The community was attacked in 1695, at which time the house was almost destroyed. In 1699, she resigned as Superior in favor of her niece and moved back to Munich, where she died on 4 May 1704. A house at St Mary's School, Ascot, which her successors founded in 1885, was named in her honour.

According to William Shiels, the Bedingfeld women "provided spiritual leadership to religious communities spread across five European states and stretching from York to Munich, as well as an enduring network of contacts for English Catholics abroad. ...and the importance of these women in sustaining English Catholicism by providing education for gentry children and hospitality to travellers cannot be overestimated."

Although the convent school was closed in 1985, Bar remains the oldest surviving Roman Catholic convent in England. But her work still persists to this day as an integral part of Catholicism in Yorkshire and in the diocese of Middlesbrough, as the Coeducational Comprehensive Secondary School: All Saints Roman Catholic School
