= Thomas Thwing =

English Catholic priest and martyr

Blessed Thomas Thwing

Martyr
- Born: c. 1635; Heworth Hall, Heworth, York
- Died: 23 October 1680 (aged 44 - 45); Knavesmire, York, England
- Venerated in: Roman Catholic Church
- Beatified: 15 December 1929 by Pope Pius XI
- Feast: 23 October

Thomas Thwing (1635–1680) was an English Catholic priest and martyr, executed for his supposed part in the Barnbow Plot, an offshoot of the fabricated Popish Plot invented by Titus Oates. His feast day is 23 October.

== Early life ==
His father was George Thwing, Esq. of Kilton Castle, Brotton, and Heworth Hall. His mother was Anne, daughter of Sir John Gascoigne and his wife Anne Ingleby, and sister of Sir Thomas Gascoigne, 2nd Baronet, of Barnbow Hall, Barwick in Elmet. Both parents were Yorkshire recusants. The martyr Edward Thwing was his great-uncle.

Thomas was born at Heworth Hall, Heworth, York, and educated at St Omer and at the English College (Douai), ordained a priest and sent to minister at the English Mission in 1665, which he did for roughly 14 years. Until April 1668, he was chaplain at Carlton Hall, the seat of his cousins, the Stapleton family. He opened a school at Quosque, the Stapletons' dower-house. He lived on Hepworth Lane, in Carlton, Selby.

In 1677 Mary Ward's Institute of the Blessed Virgin Mary (I.B.V.M.) began its foundation at Heworth Manor (also called Heworth Hall), which had been purchased in 1678 by Thomas' maternal uncle, Sir Thomas Gascoigne, from Sir George "for my niece Ellen," Thomas' sister, after which it was given to the order. Thwing's sisters, Anne, Catherine, Ellen (Helen) and cousin Jane, were instrumental to the founding of the order, Dolebank Convent and the Bar Convent. It was at the Manor House that Thwing would become chaplain and where he was arrested in early 1679.

== "Barnbow plot" ==
At the time of the Titus Oates scare, or "Popish Plot", two servants, Bolron and Mowbray, who had been discharged from Sir Thomas Gascoigne's service for dishonesty, sought vengeance and reward by revealing a supposed plot by Gascoigne and others to murder King Charles II. At first, the informers made no mention of Thwing. Nevertheless, Gascoigne, his daughter Lady Tempest, Thwing, and others were arrested on the night of 7 July 1679, and removed to London for trial at Newgate.

Gascoigne demanded to be tried by a Yorkshire jury, whom the judges admitted were better equipped to decide on the credibility of witnesses, most of whom they knew personally, than were the judges themselves. The trial was postponed to the summer assizes. Thwing was brought to the bar on 29 July, and Gascoigne's former servant, Robert Bolron, testified against him. All of the accused were acquitted except Thwing, who was brought back to York, where he was arraigned at York on 17 March 1680, along with, among others, a kinsman, Sir Miles Stapleton.

The prosecution presented a list of Catholics which had been found on the night of the arrest, accusing them of conspiracy. The defense argued that the Catholics in question were simply supporters of the new convent at Dolebank which Lady Tempest had recently founded. The judges acquitted Lady Tempest, Miles Stapleton, and Mary Presswicks, ruling that Presswick's statement that "we shall never be at peace till we are all of the Roman Catholic faith" was not treasonable, but a simple expression of opinion. Thwing, however, was found guilty; upon hearing the sentence, he bowed his head and said in Latin "Innocens ego sum" ("I am innocent").

The King at first reprieved him, but owing to a remonstrance of the Commons the death warrant was issued on the day after the meeting of Parliament. Thwing was hung, drawn, and quartered at the Tyburn in York on October 23, 1680. His friends interred his quartered body. According to the antiquary Francis Drake (1736) he was buried in the churchyard of St Mary Castlegate, York (nearest to York Castle) in a coffin with this inscription on a brass plate: R D Thomas Thweng of Heworth collegii Anglo-Duaceni sacerdos, post 15 annos in Anglicana missione transactos Eboraci condemnatus, martyrio affectus est Oct die 23 anno Dom. 1680. Duobus falsis testibus ob crimen conspirationis tunc temporis catholicis maliciose (?) impositum.

John Philipps Kenyon observed that Thwing was executed for conspiracy, despite the logical difficulty of a conspiracy without any other conspirators.

== Posthumous ==
Thomas Thwing was declared Venerable by Pope Leo XIII on 9 December 1886 and beatified by Pope Pius XI on 15 December 1929 and henceforth known as the "Blessed Thomas Thwing".

== See also ==
- Douai Martyrs

== Sources ==
- Godfrey Anstruther, The Seminary Priests, Mayhew McCrimmon, Great Wakering, 1976, pp. 225–226.
- John William Willis-Bund, A Selection of Cases from the State Trials, University Press, Cambridge, 1882, vol. II, pp. 1055 and 1117ff.
