= Mary Ward (book) =

Biography of Mary Ward by Ida Görres

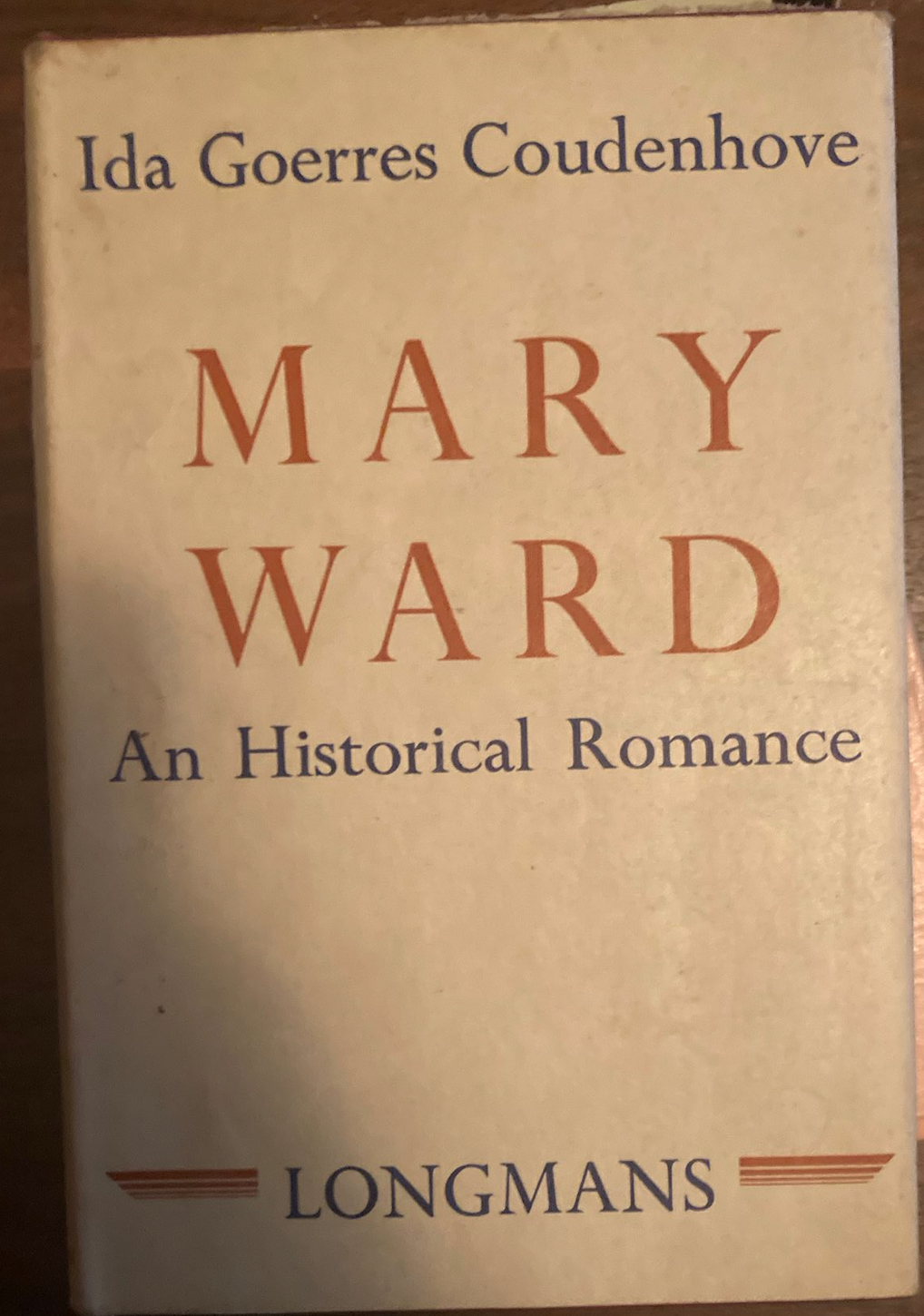
Dust jacket cover of the 1939 edition of Mary Ward.

The book Mary Ward by Ida Friederike Görres (née von Coudenhove) presents the life of Catholic nun Venerable Mary Ward (1585 –1645). It was originally published in German in 1932 by Verlag Anton Pustet under the title Mary Ward: Eine Heldenlegende and republished in 1952 by Verlag Herder under the title Das grosse Spiel der Maria Ward. It was translated into English by Elise Codd and published as Mary Ward in London in 1939 by Longmans, Green and Co.

Görres was likely inspired in part by her education at a convent school for girls in St. Pölten, Austria, run by nuns who belonged to an order founded by Mary Ward.

== Sources ==
In the author's note to Mary Ward, Ida Görres cites multiple biographies about Mary which she used to verify the historical accuracy of her book. However, she also recreates various imagined details such as dialogue to better retell her story. She writes:

The setting of the scenes and the dialogue is, of course, for the greatest part imaginary. But I have not added a single event or episode to the material I found ready in [Mary Ward's] biographies. As to the conversations and even soliloquies assigned to Mary Ward herself, they are...chiefly built up from...speeches and thoughts of her own as are recorded in [her] letters, discourses, spiritual diaries, and notes.

— Ida Friederike Görres, Mary Ward, Preface

== Plot ==
Mary Ward is separated into four sections. The first details Ward's early life living with her family in Mulwith, West Riding of Yorkshire, England throughout her childhood and early life, up until she decides to join a monastery in northern France. During this period, she goes to live with her grandparents and meets her aunt Martha as well as Martha's servant, Meg. Martha takes Mary to get her fortune told by a fortune teller, who says that Mary will travel to foreign places during her life. Then, she receives news that her younger brother has been born, so she returns to live with her parents. As she grows older, Mary starts to dream of becoming a nun, while her parents begin positioning her for marriage. Eventually, Mary's father decides that she will marry Edward Neville, heir to become the Earl of Westmorland, but Mary refuses, and after her two aunts are arrested and convicted in the Gunpowder Plot, she leaves England and joins a monastery of Poor Clares at Saint Omer in northern France.

The second section describes Mary's life in the monastery. Mary meets Father Keynes, who directs her to the Poor Clares monastery, saying that "God has decided [on a convent] for you." However, she quickly realizes that she isn't well-suited to life at the convent, as her days become dull and fatiguing with little time for real spiritual contemplation. On Visitation Day, Mary receives an audience with the general commissioner, who rules over the convents in Flanders and northern Germany, and she outlines to him a plan to create an English-speaking Poor Clares convent, to better benefit English-speaking nuns. Over the next several weeks and months, she helps direct the establishment of the new convent, and eventually, the project is completed. Section two ends as Mary receives a sign from God and realizes that she must leave the monastery.

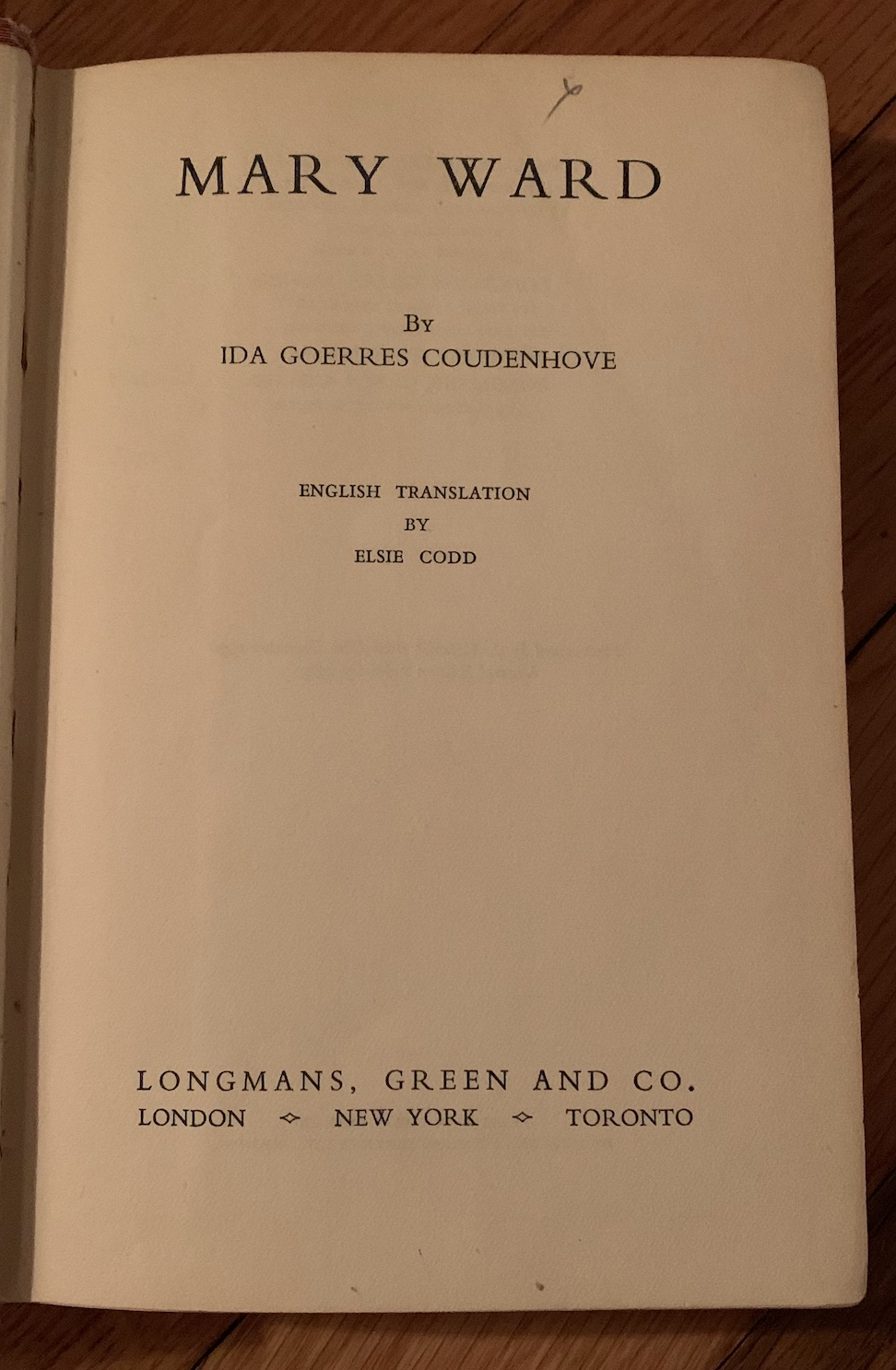
Title page of Mary Ward, 1st edition, 1939

The third and longest section begins with Mary returning to England and her family, and going back to normal life. She soon finds herself surrounded by a group of friends, including Winefrid Wigmore, determined to travel with her wherever she goes and support her endeavors. With their encouragement, Mary decides to take her friends with her back to St. Omer and, using their help, starts a Catholic girls' school. As she reveals to Winefrid, Mary plans on creating a women's institution for apostolic ministry similar to that of the Society of Jesus. The venture becomes successful, but it is also met with much controversy, as many believe that women are not cut out for missionary work. To try and acquire the sanction of the Holy See, which would grant her institution legitimacy, Mary decides to go to Rome and request an audience with Pope Urban VIII.

Mary and her companions make the perilous journey to Rome on foot and arrive on Christmas Eve. Mary receives a papal audience, but her requests go nowhere and eventually, she opens a school there, so that the Church can examine her work and thus verify that it is legitimate. Mary, along with a few other companions, then journeys across Europe to, among other places, Naples, Perugia, Munich, Vienna, and Prague, establishing schools as she goes. Because of her extensive travel on foot, Mary's health increasingly deteriorates, and at times she approaches the brink of death. She also continues her appeals to the Catholic Church that her schools be sanctioned, but is unsuccessful in her attempts, and many continue to be hostile to her, saying that her institutes are "nothing more nor less than heresy in disguise, a self-glorification of women, . . . a contempt of authority, dangerous exaltation, and a mania for spiritual adventure." Mary finally returns to Munich, but there she is greeted with a warrant for her arrest for being a heretic, schismatic, and instigator of revolt. Thus, she is imprisoned in a convent. Her health begins to decline. Mary is, however, able to continue contact with the outside world thanks to coded letters written with lemon juice as invisible ink.

Eventually, Mary receives an opportunity to write to the pope and, acknowledging her fault and asking pardon for her offenses, requests to be set free. After a few weeks, the answer arrives from Rome, ordering that Mary be immediately released. That ends section three.

Section four chronicles Mary's final journey to Rome, return to England, and death after the beginning of the English Civil War. In Rome, she establishes a house for refugees of the English civil war and stays for some time in their company, but as her health continues to get worse and Mary realizes that she is dying, she decides that she wants to be buried in England. After traveling back to her home country, she settles in Heworth, near York, while the war continues around them. There, Mary dies, surrounded by her followers.

== Reception ==
Görres's Mary Ward was generally well-received and valued as an important work of biography as well as hagiography. In New Blackfriars, Margaret Murphy observed, "the book is ... delightful, and the writer, though dealing with her subject in a decidedly subjective manner, has handled Mary's inner life with commendable reticence and respect." At the same time, Murphy comments, "We would welcome a little less reticence about the historical background of Mary's life." Helen White wrote in the Catholic Historical Review that "perhaps the finest thing about Miss Coudenhove's study is her presentation of her heroine's spirit. . . . Miss Coudenhove reveals descriptive gifts of a very high order in the brilliant series of scenes through which she follows Mary Ward." A reviewer in Argentina praised Görres's "lively" portrayal of Mary Ward.

== Translations ==
In addition to English, Görres's Mary Ward has been translated from German into Czech, Dutch, Hungarian, and Spanish:

- Czech: Velká hra Mary Wardové (2003), translated by Hana Fischerová
- Dutch: Mary Ward: een heldensage (1936), translated by Annie Salomons
- Hungarian: Egy hősi élet hősi legendája: Ward Mária (1938), translated by Thurzó Gábor
- Spanish: María Ward: una leyenda heróica (1945), translated by Rosemarie Ortloff
