= St Mary's School Ascot =

Girls' school in Ascot, Berkshire, England

Location
- St Mary's Road; Ascot, Berkshire, SL5 9JF; England
- Coordinates: 51.3943°N 0.6703°W

Information
- Type: Private day and boarding school
- Motto: Latin: Ad maiorem Dei gloriam (For the greater glory of God)
- Religious affiliation: Roman Catholic
- Established: 1885
- Founder: Mary Ward
- Local authority: Windsor and Maidenhead
- Department for Education URN: 110120 Tables
- Chair of the Governors: Clementine Vaughan
- Headmistress: Danuta Staunton
- Gender: Female
- Age: 11 to 18
- Enrolment: 386 pupils (2019)
- Website: st-marys-ascot.co.uk

St Mary's School Ascot is a Roman Catholic independent day and boarding school for girls in Ascot, Berkshire, England. It is a member of the Girls' Schools Association. It was named 2015 "Public School of the Year" at the annual Tatler Schools Awards. It was ranked No. 1 in the U.K. by The Daily Telegraph in the 2018 GCSEs.

== History ==
St Mary's School was founded by the Institute of the Blessed Virgin Mary (IBVM). The school chapel was built in 1885 and funded by Cecilia Marshall, and the First Mass was celebrated there on 2 July 1896. The Chapel is dedicated to Our Lady of Humility and St Cecilia. It was consecrated by Bishop John Baptist Cahill in 1906.

Since 1984, it has been run by the St Mary's School Ascot Trust. In 1998 the school had its first lay Headmistress, Mrs Mary Breen.

In 2006, the school opened its new sports centre, named the Orchard Centre after the Catholic family from which the school's two previous headmistresses came. The Centre was opened by ballerina Darcey Bussell. A Performing Arts Centre has also been built named the Rose Theatre. It opened in April 2009.

In 2018, the school inaugurated its new Upper Sixth (Year 13) Courtyard: new boarding houses area for girls.

== Curriculum ==
St Mary's has enjoyed success in both GCSE and A Levels examinations.

It was listed in The Independent's top 100 schools for 2012 based on the most recent A Levels results.

In 2018 the girls' school achieved 1st place in the U.K. based on their GCSE results with a 97.5% A*-A or 9-1 rate - one of four schools to surpass 97% for the top grades, according to the Independent Schools Council (ISC).

In 2018, girls placed 21st in the U.K. in their A Level results according to the Best Schools: UK School League Ranking based on their 75.77% A*-A results.

In 2019, girls placed 12th in the Top U.K. Boarding School Ranking based on their 77.1% A*-A results.

In 2022, the girls' school achieved 10th place in the U.K independent school GCSE table with 94.7% of girls achieving 9-7 grades.

== Pastoral care ==
As St Mary's is a Catholic school, girls are required to attend chapel and worship services. Throughout the Liturgical year the whole school community gather together to celebrate Feast Days and Holy Days of Obligation. Spiritual retreats are also organised for each year. The boarding areas are stationed around the school and the girls sleep within their year group.

== Houses ==
Most pupils at St Mary's are boarders. The house system is based on the boarding programme and each house has a mix of boarders and day girls. Each girl between Year 7 and Lower 6th (Year 12) belongs to one of the six main houses - Babthorpe, Bedingfeld, Dawson, Poyntz, Rookwood and Wigmore - which are named after Mary Ward's fellow nuns. Only girls in Upper Sixth (Year 13) are members of the Mary Ward house.

Each house has a captain, vice-captain and other leadership roles (e.g. prefects, drama captain) who are elected by house pupils.

House	Colour
Babthorpe	
Bedingfeld	
Dawson	
Poyntz	
Rookwood	
Wigmore	
Mary Ward	

The Heads of House are the first point of contact for girls and parents and most also teach at the school. All Heads of House have an office in the main body of the school and live on site with their families. Every house organises activities and social events on the weekends, which parents are encouraged to attend.

== Notable former pupils ==
- Ana Botín, Spanish banker, executive chairman of the Santander Group
- Katherine Garrett-Cox, managing director and CEO of the UK subsidiary for the Gulf International Bank of Bahrain
- Sarah Hogg, Viscountess Hailsham, economist/journalist
- Hon. Charlotte Hogg, economist/banker
- Princess Adelheid of Liechtenstein, economist and diplomat
- Phoebe Plummer, British climate change activist
- Dame Philippa Whipple, British high court judge and barrister
- Pamela Brown, actress
- Annabel Mullion, actress
- Zena Marshall, actress
- Dame Marina Warner, writer, novelist
- Lady Antonia Fraser, writer, novelist, daughter of Frank Pakenham, 7th Earl of Longford
- Lady Kinvara Balfour, creative director, writer, producer
- Louise Minchin, BBC journalist and news presenter
- Annoushka Ducas MBE, founder of Links of London and Annoushka
- Olga Polizzi CBE, hotelier and interior designer, daughter of Charles Forte, Baron Forte
- Caroline, Princess of Hanover, daughter of Rainier III, Prince of Monaco
- Infanta Elena, Duchess of Lugo, daughter of Juan Carlos I of Spain and Sophia of Greece and Denmark
- Infanta Cristina of Spain, daughter of Juan Carlos I of Spain and Sophia of Greece and Denmark
- Victoria Federica de Marichalar y Borbón, granddaughter of Juan Carlos I of Spain and Sophia of Greece and Denmark
- Lady Marina Charlotte Windsor, granddaughter of Prince Edward, Duke of Kent
- Lady Amelia Windsor, granddaughter of Prince Edward, Duke of Kent
- Lady Louise Mountbatten-Windsor, granddaughter of Queen Elizabeth II, daughter of Prince Edward, Duke of Edinburgh
- Lady Margarita Armstrong-Jones, daughter of David Armstrong-Jones, 2nd Earl of Snowdon and granddaughter of Princess Margaret
- Frances Stonor Saunders, Journalist, historian and author
- Leonora Carrington, Surrealist artist and author
