= Congregation of Jesus =

Roman Catholic religious congregation

- Congregatio Jesu
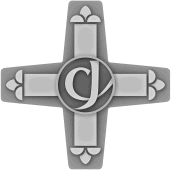
- Abbreviation: C.J.
- Formation: 27 September 1609; 417 years ago
- Type: Catholic religious order
- Headquarters: Generalate
- Location: Via Nomentana 250, Rome, Italy
- Superior General: Veronica Fuhrmann CJ
- Key people: Mary Ward, foundress
- Parent organization: Roman Catholic Church
- Staff: 1500
- Website: Congregatio Jesu

The Congregation of Jesus is one of two congregations of religious sisters founded during the 17th century through the work of the nun Mary Ward, who was dedicated to female education. The other congregation is the Sisters of Loreto, a name they shared until recently, which is also spread widely around the world. In England their primary house is the Bar Convent in York, the oldest such community in the country. Members of the congregation add the postnominal initials of C.J. or CJ after their names.

== History ==
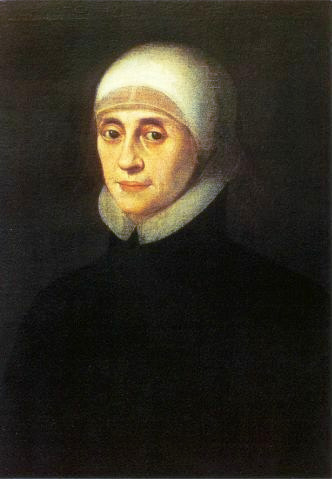
Mary Ward, foundress

Mary Ward was a member of a Roman Catholic family during the period of persecution of Catholics in Tudor England. Originally attempting a life of contemplation in the Spanish Netherlands, she became convinced that she was called to serve in a more active way, especially in her native country. She saw education as the best way for women to further their own gifts and was joined in this vision by a small band of other English women. Under her leadership, they established a religious community in Saint-Omer in 1609 which soon opened a school to educate the daughters of English Catholic families.

The community was founded in the spirit of the Society of Jesus, envisioning a life in which the Sisters would not be confined to a cloister and would be free to meet the various needs of the people they served as needed. This, however, quickly met criticism and opposition from church authorities. The Council of Trent had forbidden new religious congregations and confined religious women to enclosure. Ward's response was, "There is no such difference between men and women... as we have seen by example of many saints who have done great things." She founded houses and schools in Liège, Cologne, Rome, Naples, Munich, Vienna, Pressburg and other places, often at the request of the local rulers and bishops, but papal approval eluded her. In 1631 Mary Ward’s institute was suppressed by Pope Urban VIII.

Summoned to Rome in 1632 Mary was forbidden to leave the city Rome or to live in community. In 1637 for reasons of health Mary was allowed to travel to Spa and then on to England. She died just outside York, during the English Civil War, on 30 January 1645.

=== The institute ===
By the end of the 17th century the institute was well established in Bavaria in Munich, Augsburg, Burghausen. It also had a foothold in England in London and York. The congregation had no formal name for many years. The sisters had been commonly called the "English Ladies" in Europe, or the "Jesuitesses" or the "Galloping Girls" in England. By the start of the 18th they had begun to use the name Institute of Mary. They received approval as a religious institute by the Holy See in 1877. The different autonomous branches which had developed around the world commonly adopted the name of Institute of the Blessed Virgin Mary in 1900.

=== Bar Convent ===
Frances Bedingfeld (who would go by the alias of "Mrs. Long", due to the continued persecution) was the leader of the community Ward had founded in London, which had been leading a discrete community life since their establishment. In 1686 she received a request by a leader of the Catholic community in York, Sir Thomas Gascoigne to provide education for the daughters of their community there. A group of sisters went there in 1686 and opened Bar Convent, where they operated a boarding school for girls.

== Current status ==
The Congregation of Jesus is an international congregation of just under 2,000 sisters in twenty-four countries spread over four continents. The international centre is in Rome.

The community of the Bar Convent continued to operate the school which they had founded when they became established in York until 1985, at which time they transferred its administration to the local diocese.

In 2002 this congregation was allowed to adopt the Constitutions of the Society of Jesus, as had been envisaged by Mary Ward. At that time they adopted the name which she had intended for them.

At present there are some 2,000 members of the congregation. The English sisters of the congregation have communities in York, London and Cambridge. The congregation is also present in Argentina, Austria, Brazil, Chile, China, Cuba, the Czech Republic, Germany, Hungary, Israel, India, Italy, Korea, Moldova, Nepal, Romania, Russia, Slovakia, Spain, Ukraine and Zimbabwe. The current Superior General is Veronica Fuhrmann from Germany.
