= Edward Thwing =

English Roman Catholic priest and martyr

Blessed
- Born: c. 1565
- Died: 26 July 1600
- Venerated in: Catholic Church
- Beatified: 22 November 1987 by Pope John Paul II

Edward Thwing (c. 1565 - 26 July 1600) was an English Catholic priest and martyr.

== Life ==
Edward Thwing was born about 1565, the second son of Thomas Thwing of Heworth, York and Jane (née Kellet, of York), his wife. He was related to the 14th-century saint John Thwing of Bridlington.

Thwing went to the English College at Reims in the summer of 1583. Then he spent some time with the Jesuits at Pont-à-Mousson. He returned to Reims in July, 1585, where he remained until September 1587. He then went to Rome to complete his studies. He returned to Reims because of ill health and became a reader of Greek and Hebrew, and a professor of rhetoric and logic. He was ordained priest at Laon on 20 December 1590. In November 1592, he went to Spa suffering from an ulcer in the knee. He returned to the English College, which had in the meantime been transferred from Reims to Douai.

He was sent on the English mission in 1597. He seems to have been immediately arrested and charged under the Jesuits, etc. Act 1584, ("An act against Jesuits, seminary priests, and such other like disobedient persons") (27 Eliz.1, c. 2). The Act commanded all Roman Catholic priests to leave the country in 40 days or they would be punished for high treason, unless within the 40 days they swore an oath to obey the Queen. Those who harboured them, and all those who knew of their presence and failed to inform the authorities would be fined and imprisoned for felony. He and Dominican friar Robert Nutter were sent to Wisbech Castle, a state ecclesiastical prison. The area of Wisbech was an important centre for English Catholicism. The castle's residents were supported by Catholic alms and were relatively comfortable. Henry Garnet reported that the keeper would allow detainees permission to move within a five-mile radius.

Thwing and Nutter escaped to Lancashire and eluded capture for three years. They were arrested again in May 1600 and were committed to Lancaster Castle, tried at the next assizes and condemned for being priests. Thwing was hung, drawn, and quartered at Lancaster, along with Robert Nutter on 26 July 1600. Thwing's grand-nephew, Thomas Thwing suffered the same fate in 1680 for his supposed part in the Barnbow Plot, an offshoot of the fabricated Popish Plot invented by Titus Oates. Thomas Thwing was beatified by Pope Pius XI in 1929.

Edward Thwing was beatified by Pope John Paul II in 1982 as one of the Eighty-five martyrs of England and Wales.

== See also ==
- Catholic Church in the United Kingdom
- Douai Martyrs
