= Robert Hornby =

Robert Hornby may refer to:

- Robert Hornby (Royal Navy officer)
- Robert Hornby (priest)
- Rob Hornby, British jockey
