= Christina Kenworthy-Browne =

Jesuit religious sister and historian

Christina Kenworthy-Browne CJ (1928–2025) was an English Roman Catholic Religious Sister of the Congregation of Jesus, as well as an academic, researcher and writer.

== Career ==
In the 1960s and 1970s Sister Christina (as she was then called according to the custom of the Order) was a member of the IBVM community and taught Classics at St Mary's Convent school, Ascot, for many years. She was a formidable scholar with considerable classroom presence. Kenworthy-Browne was archivist and librarian at the Bar Convent in York, the oldest surviving convent in England. She also served as head of St Mary's School, Cambridge. She was a member of the Catholic Record Society.

Kenworthy-Browne researched the history of recusancy in Great Britain and participated at the Downside Abbey Conference on Recusant Archives and Remains from the Three Kingdoms (1560–1789). In 2009 at the opening of Bar Convent's Jubilee 400 Heritage Project, Sister Christina Kenworthy-Browne introduced a new edition of A Briefe Relation (1650), the oldest biography of Mary Ward, the founder of both the Sisters of Loreto and the Congregation of Jesus, inspired by the way of life of the Society of Jesus.

== Family ==
Sister Christina was the sister of John Anthony Kenworthy-Browne, also a historian and writer.
