= Burnholme Community College =

Location
- Bad Bargain Lane; Burnholme, York, North Yorkshire, YO31 0GW; England
- Coordinates: 53.9642°N 1.0484°W

Information
- Type: Community school
- Closed: 2014
- Local authority: City of York
- Colour: Green

Burnholme Community College was a high school on the east side of York, North Yorkshire. It served the suburbs of Heworth, Tang Hall and parts of Osbaldwick. Due to declining enrolment, the college closed in 2014. Most of its pupils were transferred to Archbishop Holgate's School, which is less than 3 mi (4.8 km) away from the former school site. Some pupils also transferred to Huntington School and Joseph Rowntree School with school buses being provided to serve the area of Tang Hall.

Part of the school site is planned to be used for a new care home.
