= Joanna Place =

British executive (born 1962)

Chief Operating Officer of the Bank of England
- In office 27 July 2017 – 14 January 2021
- Preceded by: Charlotte Hogg
- Succeeded by: Ben Stimson

Personal details
- Born: 21 June 1962 (age 64) London, England
- Citizenship: United Kingdom
- Education: Fitzwilliam College, Cambridge

Joanna Ruth "Jo" Place (born 21 June 1962) is a British executive who served as the chief operating officer of the Bank of England between July 2017 and January 2021.

== Early life and education ==
Place was born on 21 June 1962 in Derby, England. She attended a state school, where she studied double maths and economics at A-Level. She studied economics at Fitzwilliam College, Cambridge, graduating with a Bachelor of Arts (BA) degree. She chose Fitzwilliam College because, at that time, it was one of only two colleges of the University of Cambridge not to require an entrance exam in addition to A-Levels. After completing her BA, Place remained at Fitzwilliam to study for a postgraduate certificate in education (PGCE) in maths and PE.

== Career ==
Place taught maths for two years before joining the graduate programme at the Bank of England. She has worked at the Bank for over 30 years, with previous roles including Executive Director of Human Resources (2014 to 2017), Head of Customer Banking Division (playing a key role in the financial crisis), Head of Monetary and Financial Statistics Division; and Director of Regulatory Operations, Prudential Regulation Authority. Place also had a secondment to the Border Agency (2004–2007). Place was appointed chief operating officer at the Bank of England on 27 July 2017. In this post, she has responsibility for the day-to-day operations of the Bank of England.

Since April 2020 Place has been a board member of Persimmon PLC.

Business positions
Preceded by Charlotte Hogg	Chief Operating Officer of the Bank of England; 2017-2021	Succeeded by Ben Stimson
