= Douglas Hogg =

British politician and barrister

The Right Honourable The Viscount Hailsham PC KC
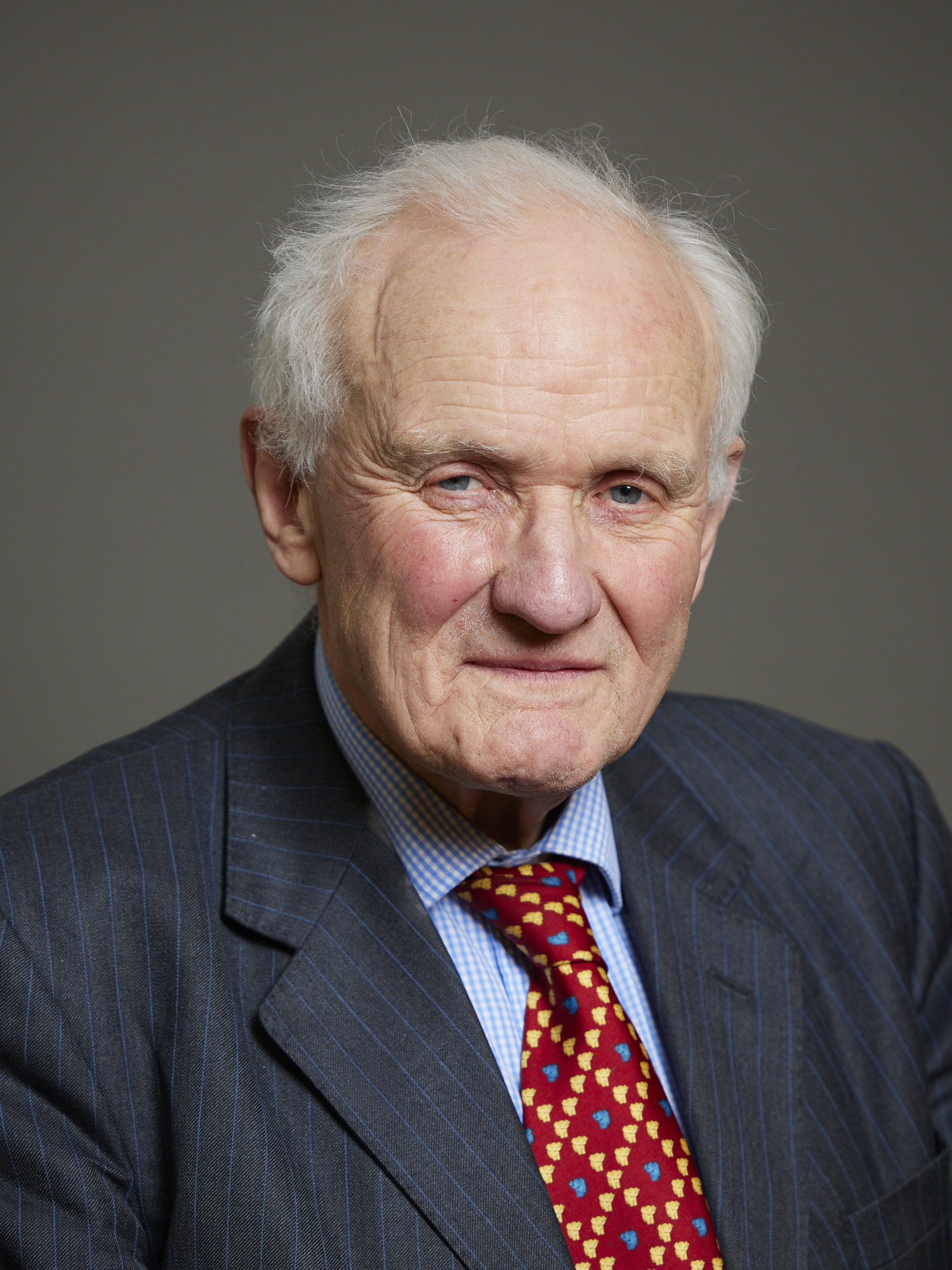
- Official portrait, 2024

Shadow Minister of Agriculture, Fisheries and Food
- In office 2 May 1997 – 17 June 1997
- Leader: John Major
- Preceded by: Jack Cunningham
- Succeeded by: David Curry

Minister of Agriculture, Fisheries and Food
- In office 5 July 1995 – 2 May 1997
- Prime Minister: John Major
- Preceded by: William Waldegrave
- Succeeded by: Jack Cunningham

Minister of State for Foreign Affairs
- In office 2 November 1990 – 5 July 1995
- Prime Minister: Margaret Thatcher; John Major
- Preceded by: William Waldegrave
- Succeeded by: Sir Nicholas Bonsor

Minister of State for Industry
- In office 26 July 1989 – 2 November 1990
- Prime Minister: Margaret Thatcher
- Preceded by: Post created
- Succeeded by: The Lord Hesketh

Parliamentary Under-Secretary of State for Home Affairs
- In office 10 September 1986 – 26 July 1989
- Prime Minister: Margaret Thatcher
- Preceded by: The Lord Glenarthur
- Succeeded by: Peter Lloyd

Member of the House of Lords
- Lord Temporal
- Life peerage 12 October 2015

Member of Parliament for Sleaford and North Hykeham Grantham (1979–1997)
- In office 3 May 1979 – 12 April 2010
- Preceded by: Joseph Godber
- Succeeded by: Stephen Phillips

Personal details
- Born: Douglas Martin Hogg; 5 February 1945 (age 81) London, England
- Party: Conservative
- Spouse: Sarah Boyd-Carpenter (m. 1968)
- Children: 2
- Parents: Quintin Hogg, Baron Hailsham of St Marylebone (father); Mary Martin (mother)
- Education: Christ Church, Oxford

Douglas Martin Hogg, 3rd Viscount Hailsham, Baron Hailsham of Kettlethorpe (born 5 February 1945), is a British politician and barrister. A member of the Conservative Party, he served in John Major's second government as Minister of Agriculture, Fisheries and Food from 1995 to 1997, and was a member of parliament (MP) from 1979 to 2010.

The Daily Telegraph in 2009 exposed Hogg for claiming upwards of £2,000 of taxpayers' money for the purposes of "cleaning the moat" of his country estate, Kettlethorpe Hall; thus he became one of the most prominent illustrations used by the media to portray the extent of the parliamentary expenses scandal, although it later emerged that Hogg had been encouraged by the House of Commons Fees Office (Independent Parliamentary Standards Authority's precursor) to submit equivalent en bloc expenses "so as to reduce admin". As a result of the negative publicity, Hogg did not seek re-election at the 2010 general election.

Aside from his hereditary peerage, he was made a life peer in the 2015 Dissolution Honours allowing him a seat in the House of Lords. As a member of the House of Lords he is styled Viscount Hailsham by parliamentary custom, the family title to which he succeeded in 2001.

== Early life ==
Douglas Hogg, elder son of Lord Hailsham of St Marylebone and former Lord Chancellor, inherited the viscountcy on 12 October 2001 upon the death of his father who had disclaimed that title for life in 1963, but who later accepted a life peerage in 1970; he is the grandson of Douglas Hogg, formerly Lord Chancellor and Lord President of the council until 1938.

He was educated at Sunningdale School followed by Eton College and Christ Church, Oxford. He served as the President of the Oxford Union in Michaelmas Term 1965, graduating with a degree in history in 1966. He was called to the bar in 1968, after which he practised as a barrister. He became a Queen's Counsel in 1990. His younger sister, Mary Hogg, a barrister, was later appointed a High Court judge assigned to the Family Division.

== Member of Parliament ==
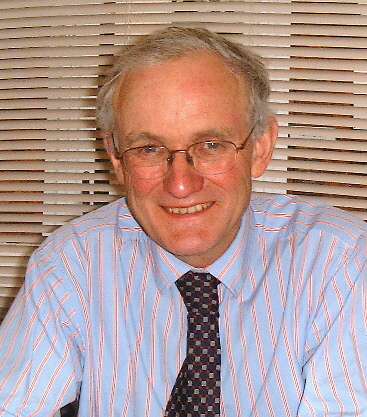
Hogg in his constituency office in 2004

The Hon. Douglas Hogg was elected as a Member of Parliament at the 1979 general election for the Lincolnshire seat of Grantham, following the retirement of the sitting Conservative MP Joseph Godber.

The Grantham seat was abolished at the 1997 general election; however, Hogg stood and was returned as MP for Sleaford and North Hykeham in 1997.

=== In government ===
A few weeks before the murder of Belfast solicitor Pat Finucane, Hogg, then a junior British minister, stated in Parliament that certain lawyers were "unduly sympathetic to the IRA." In the Stevens Inquiry run by the British state, Hogg's comments in Parliament were deemed to have potentially led to the killing of Belfast solicitor Pat Finucane.

"2.17 My Enquiry team also investigated an allegation that senior RUC officers briefed the Parliamentary Under Secretary of State for the Home Department, the Rt Hon Douglas Hogg QC, MP, that 'some solicitors were unduly sympathetic to the cause of the IRA'. Mr Hogg repeated this view during a debate on the Prevention of Terrorism legislation in the House of Commons. Within a few weeks Patrick Finucane was murdered. Mr Hogg's comments about solicitors' support for terrorism made on 17 January 1989 aroused controversy. To the extent that they were based on information passed by the RUC, they were not justifiable and the Enquiry concludes that the Minister was compromised.

In Parliament, Hogg served as a member of the Agriculture, Fisheries and Food Select committee from 1979, until his appointment as Parliamentary Private Secretary (PPS) to the Chief Secretary to the Treasury, Leon Brittan, in 1982.

Hogg became a junior member of the Government of Prime Minister Margaret Thatcher following the 1983 general election, when he served as a Whip for a year. He rejoined HM Government in 1986 when he was appointed as a Parliamentary Under-Secretary of State at the Home Office, and was promoted in 1989 to Minister of State at the Department of Trade and Industry.

Hogg was moved in 1990 under the leadership of Prime Minister John Major to the Foreign and Commonwealth Office, becoming a member of the Privy Council in 1992. He joined Major's Cabinet as the Minister of Agriculture, Fisheries and Food in 1995, serving in that capacity during the BSE crisis for which he received much criticism and remaining in post until the election of Tony Blair's Labour Government in 1997.

On 3 March 1997, a disgruntled farmer from Anglesey, Louis Hayward, drove six hours from his farm to Kettlethorpe Hall in order to dump three tonnes of pig manure outside Hogg's house.

Following the 1997 general election, Hogg was appointed a member of the Home Affairs Select Committee for a year and was a backbencher Member of Parliament until 2010. The House of Lords Act 1999 removed the automatic right of hereditary peers to a seat in the House of Lords, so when his father died in 2001 (being heir apparent to the peerage), he was not required (as would previously have been the case) to resign from the House of Commons and remained an MP until retiring in 2010.

=== Stevens Enquiry ===
In the report of his enquiry concerning collusion in Northern Ireland between loyalist paramilitaries and the security forces, under "Other Matters concerning Collusion", a section of Sir John Stevens' report reads:

"2.17 My Enquiry team also investigated an allegation that senior Royal Ulster Constabulary officers briefed the Parliamentary Under-Secretary of State for the Home Department, the Rt Hon Douglas Hogg QC MP, that 'some solicitors were unduly sympathetic to the cause of the IRA'. Mr Hogg repeated this view [their expressed concerns] during a debate on the Prevention of Terrorism legislation in the House of Commons. Within a few weeks Patrick Finucane was murdered. Mr Hogg's comments about solicitors' support for terrorism made on 17 January 1989 aroused controversy. To the extent that they were based on information passed by the RUC, they were not justifiable and the Enquiry [Inquiry] concludes that the Minister was compromised."

=== Expenses ===
Hogg claimed near maximum Additional Costs Allowance in the 2001 and 2005 UK Parliaments.

In 2009, during the row over MPs' expenses, The Daily Telegraph alleged that Hogg had submitted, and was paid, a claim including more than £2,000 for the moat around his country estate, Kettlethorpe Hall, to be cleared. The taxpayer helped meet the cost of a full-time housekeeper. Other claims were for expenses for work done to Hogg's stables and for his piano to be tuned. He generously spent or perhaps somewhat overspent on his farm and home office: Hogg agreed a deal with the expenses office simply to have one twelfth of the second homes allowance paid into his bank account every month.

In his defence, Hogg resolutely stated he had not claimed for moat cleaning, and that the items were a list of all expenses incurred during house works, most of which were not paid for by the taxpayer. Hogg responded to the newspaper's report by saying he had agreed the claims with the Fees Office, and therefore hoped and believed that they would comply with the rules and the "spirit of the rules" as advised. In saying that his claims complied with both the spirit and letter of the rules, Hogg said he had issued, in the interests of transparency, full lists of all his expenditure on the property but these were never meant to be the record of a claim.

On 14 May, Hogg agreed to repay the £2,200 cost of clearing the moat, after an order from the party leadership. He maintained he had not claimed the money, but agreed it had not been "positively excluded" from paperwork submitted to the Commons Fees Office. Following the scandal, Hogg announced on 19 May 2009 that he would not stand at the following general election.

== House of Lords ==
Prime Minister David Cameron put Hailsham forward for a life barony to be included in the 2011 New Year Honours, but House of Lords Appointments Commission advised against the appointment.

In 2013, Hailsham stood for election to the House of Lords seat made vacant by the death of the 13th Earl Ferrers, losing to the 5th Viscount Ridley. Months later, he stood for the hereditary peers' vacancy to the 90-elected such seats in the House of Lords, following the death of Hugh Mackay, 14th Lord Reay, when Lord Borwick was elected.

On 12 October 2015, he was created a life peer as Baron Hailsham of Kettlethorpe, of Kettlethorpe in the County of Lincolnshire, enabling him to sit in the House of Lords.

== In film and fiction ==
In February 2010 he was played by Geoffrey Beevers in the television film On Expenses.

== Marriage and children ==
Hogg married Hon. Sarah Boyd-Carpenter, daughter of John, Baron Boyd-Carpenter, on 6 June 1968 in Westminster. They have two children:

- Hon. Charlotte Mary Hogg (born 26 August 1970), previously in charge of retail operations at Santander UK, in 2013 she was appointed first Chief Operating Officer at the Bank of England, under Governor Mark Carney. In March 2017 she served briefly as Deputy Governor (Markets and Banking), before resigning from both positions for failure to declare that her brother was employed in the banking industry.
- Hon. Quintin John Neil Martin Hogg (born 12 October 1973), heir apparent to the viscountcy.

As his wife was created a life peer as Baroness Hogg in 1995, the Hailshams are among the few couples both of whom hold noble titles in their own right.

== Arms ==
Coat of arms of Douglas Hogg
Notes The arms granted to the 1st Viscount Hailsham KG Crest Out of an Eastern Crown Argent an Oak-tree fructed Proper pendant therefrom an Escutcheon Azure charged with a Dexter arm embowed in armour the hand grasping an Arrow in bend sinister the point downwards also Proper. Escutcheon Argent three Boars' Heads erased Azure langued Gules between two Flaunches also Azure each charged with a Crescent of the Field. Supporters On either side a Ram Argent armed and unglued Or gorged with a Baron's Coronet the dexter supporting a representation of the Lord High Chancellor's Mace the sinister a representation of the Lord High Chancellor's Purse with the initials of Her Majesty Queen Elizabeth II Proper Motto Dat Gloria Vires (Glory gives strength)

Parliament of the United Kingdom
Preceded by Joseph Godber	Member of Parliament for Grantham; 1979–1997	Constituency abolished
New constituency	Member of Parliament for Sleaford and North Hykeham; 1997–2010	Succeeded by Stephen Phillips
Political offices
Preceded by William Waldegrave	Minister of State for Agriculture, Fisheries and Food; 1995–1997	Succeeded by Jack Cunningham
Peerage of the United Kingdom
Disclaimed Title last held by Quintin Hogg	Viscount Hailsham; 2001–present	Incumbent
Orders of precedence in the United Kingdom
Preceded by The Viscount Bridgeman	Gentlemen; Viscount Hailsham	Followed by The Viscount Brentford
