= Kenworth (disambiguation) =

Kenworth is an American-based truck manufacturer.

Kenworth may also refer to:

- Kenworth T600, a model line of trucks produced 1984–2007
- Kenworth W900, a model line of trucks whose production began in 1961
- Kenworth Historic District, in Hickory, Catawba County, North Carolina
- Jim Kenworth, British playwright
- Kenworth Moffett (1934–2016), American art curator

== See also ==
- Kenworthy (disambiguation)
