= Winefrid Wigmore =

Catholic biographer

Winefred Wigmore (1585–1657) was an English Roman Catholic nun and teacher, a friend and biographer of Mary Ward.

== Life ==
Winefred Wigmore was born at Lucton, one of twelve children born to Sir William Wigmore and Anne Throckmorton. Three of her brothers, including William Wigmore, became Jesuits. She met Mary Ward in 1605, and lived with her in London on Ward's return to England in 1609. She remained "Mary Ward's close friend and loyal companion until Mary's death", helping found the Institute of the Blessed Virgin Mary.

In 1622–23 Wigmore became headmistress of schools established in Rome and then Naples, and in 1624 she was appointed superior in Naples. In 1630 Ward sent Wigmore to deal with the foundation at Liège, who were unhappy with Ward. Wigmore's loyalty to Ward led to her deposing the Liège superior, Mary Copley, and the rift gave ammunition to the institute's detractors in the papal court. Though the pope suppressed the Institute in 1631, and Wigmore was briefly imprisoned, the 'English ladies' kept up discreet communal life in Munich and Rome. Wigmore stayed in Rome with Ward, acting as her novice mistress, secretary, and nurse. She accompanied Ward to England in 1637, living with her in London and Heworth until Ward's death in 1645.

After Ward's death, Wigmore and Mary Poyntz continued the institute. The execution of Charles I made it dangerous to continue living in England, and in 1650 Institute members relocated to Paris under the leadership of Barbara Babthorpe. Wigmore was headmistress of a school of English girls there. She died in April 1657, and was buried in the cemetery of the Benedictine nuns.

Wigmore and Poyntz composed Ward's first biography, the Briefe relation. Manuscript copies exist in both French and English.

== Works ==
- (with Mary Poyntz) A briefe relation of the holy life & happy death of our dearest mother, of blessed memory, Mrs. Mary Ward
