= Sarah Hogg, Viscountess Hailsham =

English economist, journalist and life peer (born 1946)

The Right Honourable The Viscountess Hailsham
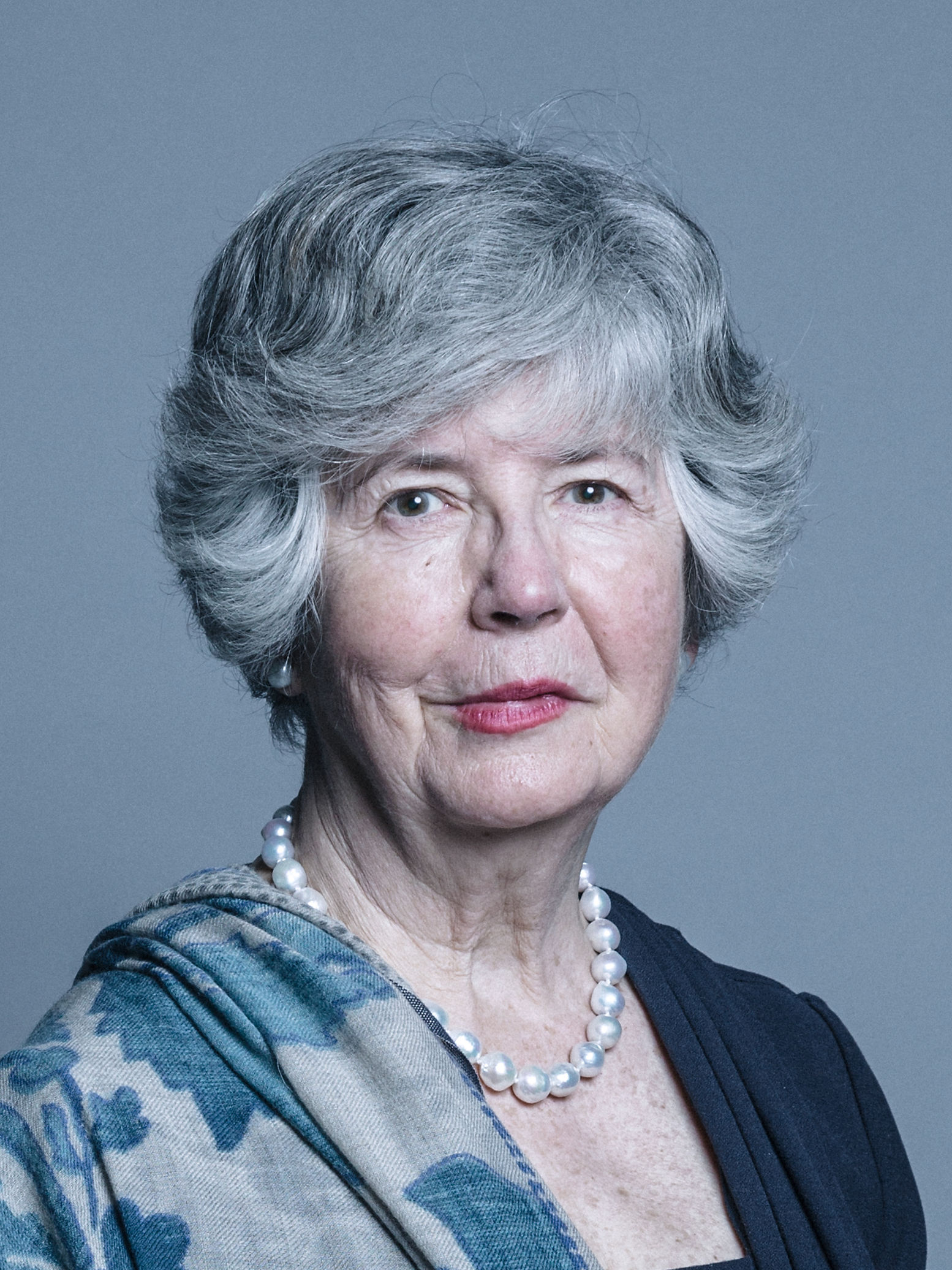
- Official portrait, 2018

Member of the House of Lords
- Lord Temporal
- Life peerage 3 February 1995

Director of the Number 10 Policy Unit
- In office 28 November 1990 – 5 July 1995
- Prime Minister: John Major
- Preceded by: Brian Griffiths
- Succeeded by: Norman Blackwell

Personal details
- Born: Sarah Elizabeth Mary Boyd-Carpenter; 14 May 1946 (age 80)
- Party: Conservative (before 2010); Crossbench (2010–present)
- Spouse: Douglas Hogg (m. 1968)
- Children: 2
- Education: Lady Margaret Hall, Oxford

Sarah Elizabeth Mary Hogg, Viscountess Hailsham, Baroness Hogg (née Boyd-Carpenter; born 14 May 1946), is a British economist, journalist, and politician. She was the first woman to chair a FTSE 100 company.

== Early life and education ==
Sarah Elizabeth Mary Boyd-Carpenter was born on 14 May 1946. Her father was John Boyd-Carpenter (later Baron Boyd-Carpenter), who served as Chief Secretary to the Treasury and Paymaster General from 1962 to 1964. She attended Miss Ironside's School in Kensington. She then went to the Roman Catholic girls' boarding school St Mary's School Ascot. Later she attended Lady Margaret Hall at the University of Oxford where she read philosophy, politics and economics (PPE). While at Oxford, she edited the student newspaper Cherwell.

== Career ==
=== Journalism ===
Hogg was an economics editor for The Independent. She was also an early presenter of Channel 4 News, but her voice, with its uncertainty of pitch, was felt by many viewers to be a distraction. At this time she portrayed Margaret Thatcher in a television docudrama of negotiations between the UK and Irish governments.

=== Politics ===
Hogg was the head of the Prime Minister's Policy Unit for Sir John Major. With Jonathan Hopkin Hill, she wrote about the Major years in her book Too Close to Call.

On 3 February 1995, she was created a life peer as Baroness Hogg, of Kettlethorpe, in the county of Lincolnshire. She was as a Conservative member of the House of Lords until May 2010 and thereafter has sat as a crossbencher.

=== Business ===
As Chairman of 3i from 2002, she became the first woman to chair a FTSE 100 company. In 2010 she was appointed the Chairman of the Financial Reporting Council. She is also the chairman of Frontier Economics Limited. Other current and former board memberships include the Financial Conduct Authority, BG Group, the BBC, P&O Cruises, P&O Princess Cruises and Eton College.

== Personal life ==
Hogg married Douglas Hogg in 1968. They have a son and a daughter.

- Hon. Charlotte Mary Hogg (born 26 August 1970), previously in charge of retail operations at Santander UK, in 2013 she was appointed first Chief Operating Officer at the Bank of England, under Governor Mark Carney, and from March 2017, she served briefly as Deputy Governor (Markets and Banking) before resigning from both positions for failure to declare that her brother was employed in the banking industry.
- Hon. Quintin John Neil Martin Hogg (born 12 October 1973), heir apparent to the viscountcy

Through her marriage, Hogg has been titled Viscountess Hailsham since her husband's succession to his hereditary peerage in 2001, and Baroness Hailsham of Kettlethorpe since his own creation as a life peer in 2015. She sits in the House of Lords under her suo jure title, Baroness Hogg.

== Other activities ==
She is a trustee of the school where she was educated and also a trustee of the charitable Trusthouse Foundation.

== Bibliography ==
- Too Close to Call: John Major, Power and Politics in No.10 by Sarah Hogg & Jonathan Hill, Little, Brown (1995), ISBN 0-316-87716-6
