= Charlotte Hogg =

British economist

The Honourable Charlotte Hogg

Deputy Governor of the Bank of England for Markets and Banking
- In office 1 March 2017 – 14 March 2017
- Governor: Mark Carney
- Preceded by: Nemat Shafik
- Succeeded by: Dave Ramsden

Chief Operating Officer of the Bank of England
- In office 1 July 2013 – 28 February 2017
- Governor: Mark Carney
- Succeeded by: Joanna Place

Personal details
- Born: 26 August 1970 (age 56) London, England
- Citizenship: United Kingdom
- Spouse: Steve Sacks (m. 1999)
- Relations: Quintin Hogg (brother)
- Children: Two
- Parent(s): Douglas Hogg; Sarah Hogg
- Education: St Mary's School, Ascot; Hertford College, Oxford; Harvard University
- Occupation: CEO of Alter Domus

Charlotte Mary Hogg (born 26 August 1970) is a British management consultant and senior executive in financial services and central banking. In July 2025, she was appointed as CEO of Alter Domus, a financial services and investment company. In October 2017 she was appointed as CEO of Visa's European operations. Hogg was the chief operating officer of the Bank of England between 2013 and 2017, and additionally served briefly as Deputy Governor (Markets and Banking) at the Bank of England from 1 March 2017 to 14 March 2017, before resigning from both positions because she had failed to declare that her brother was employed in the banking industry.

Hogg previously worked for McKinsey & Company, Morgan Stanley, and Discover Financial in the United States, and Experian and Santander UK in the UK.

== Early life ==
The Hon Charlotte Hogg was born on 26 August 1970 in London, England. Both her parents hold peerages in their own right: her father is the 3rd Viscount Hailsham, a former Member of Parliament and hereditary peer as well as being a life peer, and her mother is the Baroness Hogg, a life peer. Both her paternal and maternal grandfathers served as Cabinet ministers, the former Quintin Hogg, Baron Hailsham of St Marylebone, who previously served as Lord Chancellor on two occasions, and the latter being John Boyd-Carpenter, Baron Boyd-Carpenter, former Chief Secretary to the Treasury and Paymaster General.

She was brought up on the family estate of Kettlethorpe Hall in Kettlethorpe, Lincolnshire.

She was educated at St Mary's School, an all-girls private Catholic school in Ascot, Berkshire; her mother also attended the school. She studied economics and history at Hertford College, Oxford and graduated from the University of Oxford with a Bachelor of Arts (BA) degree. From 1991 to 1992, having been selected as a Kennedy Scholar, she undertook further study at Harvard University.

== Career ==
Hogg began her career at the Bank of England as a graduate trainee from 1992 to 1994. From 1994 to 2001, she worked for McKinsey & Company in Washington, D.C., United States. She then moved to Morgan Stanley where she was managing director for Strategy and Planning between 2001 and 2007. From 2007 to 2008, she worked for Discover Financial.

In 2008, she returned to the United Kingdom to join Experian and was appointed a managing director with responsibility for the UK and Ireland operations. She moved to Santander UK in September 2011 as head of high street operations. In 2012, she earned £2.5 million.

=== Bank of England ===
In June 2013, she was selected as the Bank of England's first chief operating officer (COO) by new Governor Mark Carney. She took up the appointment on 1 July 2013. This made her the most senior female employee in the bank's history, and effectively the deputy to the Governor of the Bank of England. In that role, she was responsible for the day-to-day management of the bank, including human resources, finance, property, IT, and security, as part of Carney's efforts to streamline the institution. However, she had no policy making decisions as that falls to the Governor and Deputy Governor. As COO, she had the same status and received the same remuneration as a Deputy Governor.

In January 2017, she was appointed Deputy Governor (markets and banking) in succession to Minouche Shafik, while retaining her title as COO. She took up the position on 1 March 2017.

==== Resignation ====
In March 2017, Hogg apologised for having previously breached the Bank of England's code of conduct and personal relationships policy. She had failed to declare a potential conflict of interest in that her brother worked in the strategy office of Barclays, subject to Bank of England regulation. Hogg gave incorrect oral evidence to the Treasury Select Committee. She issued a letter of apology to the committee.

Hogg resigned from her posts at the Bank of England on 14 March after the Select Committee criticised her failure to disclose the conflict, to recognise the seriousness of this and to realise the potential for conflict of interest in her new role. The Committee said her conduct "fell short of the very high standards" required and that the committee had "set aside" its previous approval of her appointment. The Bank of England conducted a search for two candidates to replace Hogg's vacated positions, one for the COO and the other for Deputy Governor (markets and banking).

=== Later career ===
Following her departure from the Bank of England, Hogg was appointed chief executive officer (CEO) of Visa's European operations in October 2017. She is currently a member of the Build Back Better Council, founded in January 2021 to "fuel COVID-19 economic recovery and future growth".

She started working in Alter Domus in 2025.

== Personal life ==
In 1999, Hogg married Steven Sacks; the couple have two children.

Business positions
New title	Chief Operating Officer of the Bank of England; 2013–2017	Succeeded by Joanna Place
Preceded by Nemat Shafik	Deputy Governor (Markets and Banking) of the Bank of England; 2017	Succeeded by Dave Ramsden
