= Anne Kenworthy =

American academic administrator

11th President of Spalding University
- Incoming
- Assumed office January 1, 2025
- Preceded by: Joanne M. Berryman (interim)

Personal details
- Education: University of Memphis; Christian Brothers University

Anne Kenworthy is an American academic administrator who is the incoming 11th president of Spalding University. She was previously worked at the University of Findlay, Crichton College, and Christian Brothers University.

== Education ==
Anne Kenworthy received a B.S. in mathematics from the University of Memphis. She earned a M.B.A. from Christian Brothers University (CBU) in 2002 and completed a M.S. in educational administration and a Ed.D. (2000) in higher and adult education, also from the University of Memphis. Kenworthy holds a fundraising management certificate from the Indiana University Indianapolis Lilly Family School of Philanthropy.

== Career ==
Kenworthy worked as a teacher in Memphis City Schools and directed the Memphis Urban Mathematics Collaborative, collaborating with brother Edward Doody at CBU on grant-funded workshops for mathematics teachers.

Her tenure at alma mater, Christian Brothers University included several roles. She initially served as dean of the evening program, later restructured as the College of Adult Professional Studies. Over the years, she held positions such as associate vice president for donor relations and vice president for enrollment management. Her work in enrollment at CBU reportedly led to increased enrollment numbers. Kenworthy continued in administrative and adjunct faculty roles at CBU intermittently through 2022.

Kenworthy managed the Memphis Sexual Assault Resource Center and served as executive director of Special Kids & Families, a program for children with developmental delays. From 2005 to 2008, she was vice president for advancement and planning at Crichton College and then briefly served as executive director of the Iris Orchestra. She has received awards for her work, including Memphis Woman magazine’s "50 Women Who Make a Difference," the "Victim Advocate of the Year" award from the Shelby County Mayor’s Office, and the "Heroism Award" from Women of Achievement.

In August 2022, Kenworthy became vice president for enrollment and marketing at the University of Findlay. On September 9, 2024, Spalding University announced her appointment as its 11th president, with her term beginning on January 1, 2025. She succeeds interim president Joanne M. Berryman.

== Personal life ==
Kenworthy has served on advisory committees for organizations, including Memphis World Relief and Tennessee Voices for Victims. She was a founding member of The Memphis Cup of Nations, a community organization, and served on the pastoral search committee for Christ United Methodist Church in Memphis, Tennessee. She has a daughter, Brooke, who is a graduate student in architecture at Cornell University.
