= Pent-roof combustion chamber =

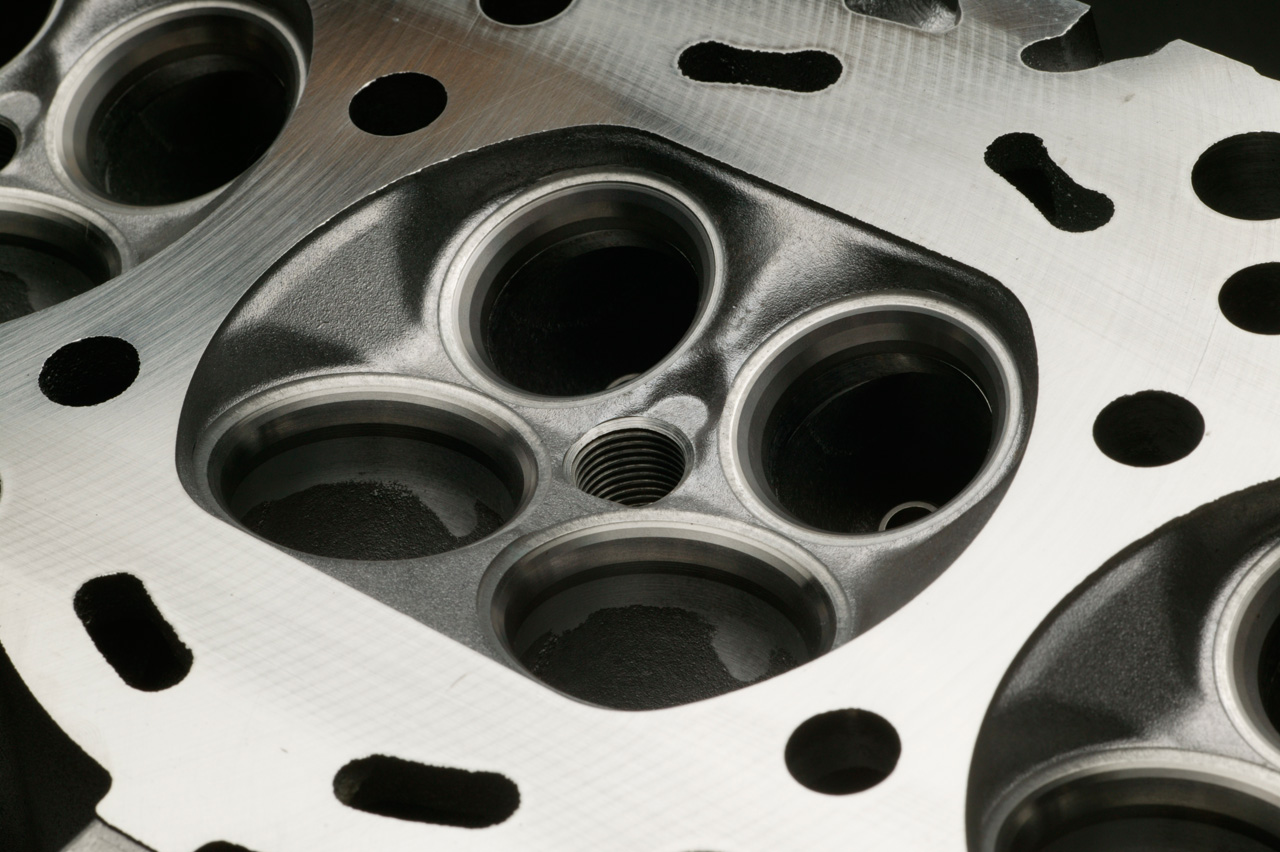
Cylinder head of the Nissan VQ35DE engine

The penta engine (or penta head) is an arrangement of the upper portion of the cylinder and valves that is common in internal combustion engines using four valves per cylinder.

== Design ==
Among the advantages of a penta head combustion chamber is a faster burn time of the air-fuel mix.

It is similar in concept to the hemi engine, both in design and purpose, but a hemispherical cylinder head is limited to only two valves without the use of a more complex sub-rocker assembly.

The four-valve penta engine design was invented by Peugeot of France, to be first used in the 1911 Indianapolis 500 race.

The penta engine (also termed pentroof combustion chamber) is the most common design used today by many manufacturers for four-valve-per-cylinder engines producing relatively high horsepower for displacement for both racing and passenger car engines.
