= Robert Hornby (priest) =

British priest (1821–1888)

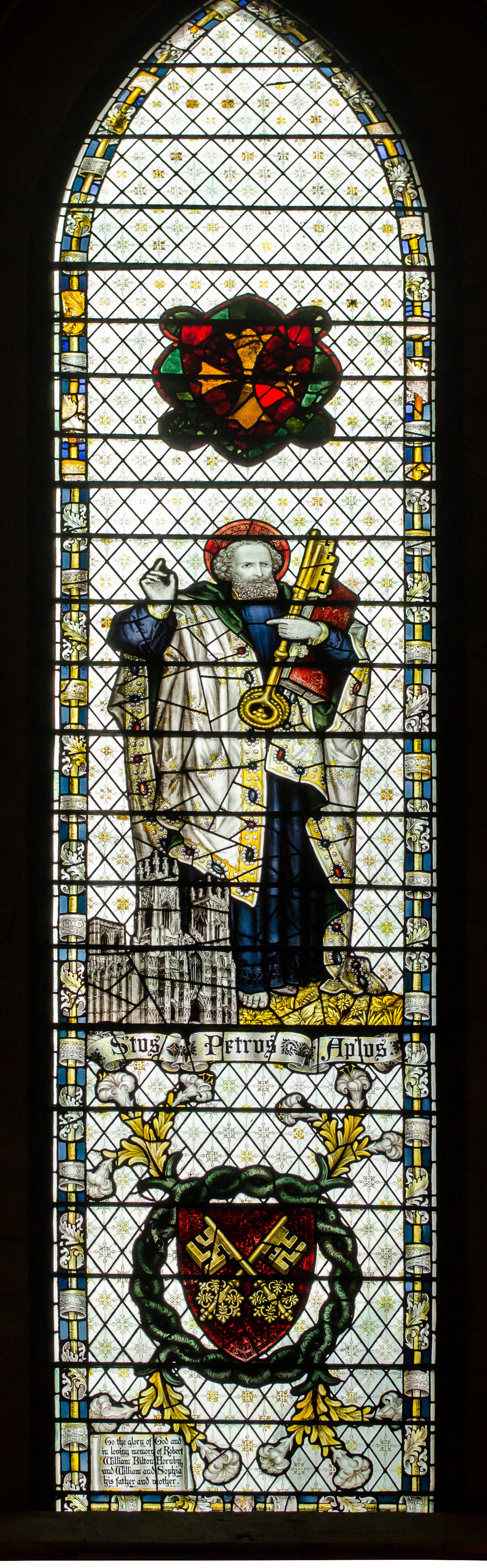
RWB Hornby Window in York Minster

Robert William Bilton Hornby (5 January 1821 – 28 September 1888) was an English antiquarian and priest, and the Lord of the manor of Heworth in York.

== Ancestry ==
Hornby was born at Heworth in 1821, the son of William Hornby and Sophia née Motte or Matt, and was baptised at St Michael le Belfrey within the City of York on the following day.

His father held the office of Sheriff in the city, and was called a gentleman. Yet curiously he was also recorded as a shoemaker of Blake Street in the city.

== Schooling ==
Young Hornby initially attended a local school run by a Mr Watson of Gillygate prior to being admitted to St Peter's School on 19 January 1829 as a "free scholar" aged 8 years old.

He entered Durham University in Easter 1838, and was one of its first undergraduates. He passed his Bachelor of Arts in Easter 1841, gaining a 4th in classical and general literature, and then passed his Licence in Theology in Easter 1842 and took it on 22 June 1842. In due course he took a Master of Arts on 28 January 1845, to which he was entitled 9 terms after his Bachelor of Arts, and then a Bachelor of Divinity on 27 January 1852, to which he was entitled 21 terms after his Master of Arts, and finally a Doctorate of Divinity on 29 January 1856, to which he was entitled 33 terms after his Master of Arts.

== Church career ==
Hornby was ordained a deacon at Norwich in 1844, and priest at Ripon in 1845. He held a curacy at Wakefield, and then one at Flaxton in 1847, but never held a living anywhere or an appointment in the ecclesiastical hierarchy of the Established Church.

Clifton Garth – April 2006

== Family life ==
Hornby married Ann(e) Smales (1825–1902) at St Mary Bishophill Junior on 27 November 1844. They had one son and three daughters: Annie (born 1846), William (born 1847), Rosalie (born 1851) and Beatrice (born 1857). The family settled nearby at 4 St Olaves Road in Clifton, which he extended. This property has been extensively altered since his time.

== Public Affairs ==
Hornby was an active Director and Trustee of the York Cemetery Company, which was founded in 1837 to establish a 24-acre (97,000 m^{2}) civil cemetery outside the city walls and relieve pressure on the historic ecclesiastical cemeteries. Both grounds and chapel were designed by James Pigott Pritchett. The company was liquidated in 1966, and after several years of neglect was obtained by the York Cemetery Trust in 1987.

He was also a manager of the York Savings Bank, which was established in 1816 for the working classes, and operated out of offices in Blake Street which were built in 1819.

He was also a noted local antiquarian, being primarily interested in the Minster, churches and City of York.

He also succeeded to the Lord of the manor of Heworth, which included the parishes of Saint Cuthbert and Saint Olave just east of the city. The Manor Hall lay off Heworth Road outside of the city walls.

== Death ==
He continued to be very active until shortly before his death on 28 September 1888, when he was aged 67.

His widow placed a window by Charles Eamer Kempe in the York Minster in his memory. It is dedicated to Saint Peter the Apostle, and is inscribed: "To the glory of God and in loving memory of Robert William Bilton Hornby, and William and Sophia his father and mother." This window may be found behind the astronomical clock in the right rear corner of the main hall.

She died at Overdene, Moseley, Birmingham on 18 February 1902.

== Papers ==
Many of Hornby's private papers are with the York Minster Archives. The Hornby collections and scrapbooks are extensive and unorganised, and rarely note sources. Papers of the York Cemetery Company and the York Savings Bank can be found in the North Yorkshire County Record Office in Northallerton, and in the York City Archives.
