= Mary Ward (nun) =

English Catholic religious sister (1585–1645)

Venerable Mary Ward IBVM CJ
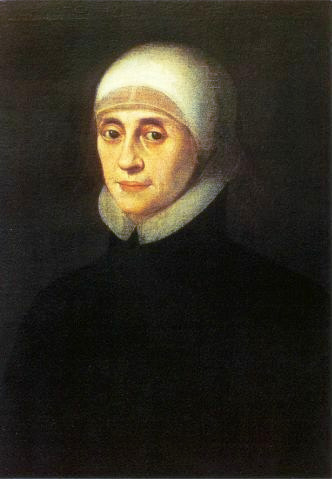
- Portrait of Mary Ward, c. 1600
- Born: Joan Ward; 23 January 1585; Mulwith, Yorkshire, England
- Died: 30 January 1645 (aged 60); Heworth, York, England

Mary Ward, IBVM CJ (23 January 1585 – 30 January 1645) was an English Catholic religious sister whose activities led to the founding of the Congregation of Jesus and the Institute of the Blessed Virgin Mary, better known as the Sisters of Loreto. There is now a network of around 200 Mary Ward schools worldwide. Ward was declared venerable by Pope Benedict XVI on 19 December 2009.

== Early life and education ==
Mary Ward was born Joan Ward in Mulwith, West Riding of Yorkshire, the first child to Marmaduke and Ursula Wright Ward (Ursula's second marriage), and took "Mary" as her confirmation name. It is postulated that Ward was of noble descent. Marmaduke of Givendale was also head of the manor in Mulwith and Newby, and Mary can include Joan Ward, Prioress of Esholt as one of many notable ancestors, the Warde arms being bestowed in the early 9th century by Ecgberht, King of Wessex "for assisting him against the other six kingdoms".

She was born at a time of great conflict for Roman Catholics in England. From 1589–1594 she lived with and was educated in Latin by her maternal grandmother, Ursula Wright, at Ploughland Hall, Welwick, who had been imprisoned for fourteen years for the "exhalation of the Catholic religion." Relatives Lady Constable, Lady Babthorpe and Lady Ingleby had also been imprisoned by the Earl of Huntingdon. It is documented, through John Jackson (b.1581) that Mary was at Ripley Castle, home of relative Sampson Ingleby, steward to the Earl of Northumberland for a brief time in 1594.

In 1595 her family home at Mulwith was burnt down in an anti-Catholic riot; the children, who were praying, were saved by their father. They went to live at the family's manor house, Newby until due to further anti-catholic sentiment they were forced to move again. Mary took first Communion in Harewell, under the care of Mrs Ardington, daughter to Sir William Ingleby of Ripley, on 8 September 1598. In 1599 she moved to the house of Sir Ralph Babthorpe at Osgodby, North Riding of Yorkshire, yet another relation and here expanded her education to include the French, Italian and German languages.

== Religious calling ==
In 1609, at the age of 24, she experienced the voice of God directing her towards a religious life (Glory Vision). She heard "Glory, Glory, Glory" while she was sitting and combing her hair.

Even with the wealth of her birth and the continued support of family and friends she did not have an easy path to a religious life. At the ages of both ten and twelve, she was proposed for marriage into two Northumbrian families, but declined "as one who already esteemed only God as worthy of her love." However, her father intended her to marry the heir of Edward Neville of Westmoreland. To persuade her, she was taken by him to the priest Richard Holtby (b. 1553) at Baldwin's Gardens, Holborn, London. It was during this trip that three of her uncles John and Christopher Wright, along with their brother-in-law Thomas Percy (also an uncle, who had married her aunt Martha Wright), were involved with and lost their lives in the Gunpowder Plot, in which Guy Fawkes attempted to blow up Parliament. Her father was also examined as a possible conspirator but was not implicated. He was able to prove that he was in London about the proposed Neville marriage. Mary could not refuse her confessor and wrote, "My confessor [...] by God's permission, was also of opinion that in no way ought I to leave England nor to make myself a religious. Whose words truly were of weight, and on this occasion caused me inexpressible distress, because I did not dare to do what he prohibited as unlawful, nor could I embrace that which he proposed as my greater good. His motives were pious, prudent, regardful of the service of God and the common good." Mary prayed for an extended period and after Mass, the priest, despite all resolutions and pre-made arrangements, discerned the contrary. Holtby had spilt the wine during Mass and interpreted it as a sign from God that the only marriage that would be suitable would be one to Christ. Mary recalled, "But the same God […] would not permit that I should be hindered through his means, so that finally He caused him to change his opinion, at least so far as to leave me to myself in this matter, which was sufficient for me".

After being refused by Mary, Edward Neville would give up the family inheritance, travel to Rome and join the Society of Jesus (the Jesuits). Neville died in prison for being a priest in 1648.

Ward left England in order to enter a monastery of Poor Clares at Saint-Omer in northern France; she then moved to the Spanish Netherlands as a lay sister. In 1606 she founded a new monastery of the order specifically for English women at nearby Gravelines, doing so with much of her own dowry.

== Establishment of the institute ==
At this time, women in the Catholic church lived an enclosed, cloistered, contemplative life, governed by others. However, Mary Ward did not find herself called to the contemplative life and instead decided to dedicate herself to an active ministry, whilst still being religious; this was considered most unusual at the time. At the age of twenty-four, she found herself surrounded by a band of devoted companions including Winefrid Wigmore determined to work under her guidance to address new needs. One of these was that it was essential to educate girls. She said in 1612, "There is no such difference between men and women that women, may they not do great things? And I hope in God that it may be seen in time to come that women will do much." In 1609 they established themselves as a religious community at Saint-Omer and opened schools for girls.

Although the venture was a great success, and grew in the 1610s and 1620s, it was still controversial at the time, and it resulted in censure and opposition as well as praise. The sisters in her religious community were called "galloping girls". Her idea was to enable women to do for the church in their proper field what men had done for it in the Society of Jesus. In the 17th century, this was met with little encouragement. As previous foundresses who attempted such an apostolic way of life (e.g., Angela Merici) had learned, uncloistered religious sisters were repugnant to long-standing principles and traditions then prevalent. At that time, the work of religious women was confined to what could be carried on within walls, either teaching boarding students within the cloister or nursing the sick in hospitals attached to the monastery.

There were other startling differences between the new Institute and existing congregations of women, including freedom from enclosure, from the obligation of praying the Liturgy of the Hours in choir, from the requirement to wear a religious habit, and from the jurisdiction of the local bishop. Moreover, her scheme was proposed at a time when there was division amongst English Catholics, and the fact that she borrowed so much from the Society of Jesus (itself an object of suspicion and hostility in many quarters) increased the mistrust. Her opponents called for a statement to be made by Church authorities. As early as 1615, the Jesuit theologians Francisco Suárez and Leonardus Lessius had been asked for their opinion on the new institute; both praised its way of life. Lessius held that local episcopal authorization sufficed to render it a religious body whereas Suárez maintained that its aim, organization, and methods being without precedent in the case of women, required the sanction of the Holy See.

Pope Pius V (1566–1572) had declared solemn vows and strict papal enclosure to be essential to all communities of religious women. It was mainly on the grounds of this ruling that difficulties were encountered when Mary applied to the Holy See for permission to expand her institute in Flanders, Bavaria, Austria, and Italy. The Archduchess Isabella Clara Eugenia, the Elector Maximilian I, and the Emperor Ferdinand II had welcomed her institute to their dominions. Churchmen such as Cardinal Federico Borromeo, Domenico de Gesù (Domenico Ruzola), and Mutio Vitelleschi, Superior General of the Society of Jesus, held her in great esteem. Popes Paul V, Gregory XV and Urban VIII had shown her great kindness and spoken in praise of her work, and in 1629 she was allowed to plead her cause in person before the congregation of cardinals appointed by Pope Urban to examine the situation.

At the express desire of Pope Urban, Mary went to Rome accompanied by her religious followers. It was there that she gathered around her the younger members of her religious family, under the supervision and protection of the Holy See. She undertook a journey to Rome about five or six times during her life. She travelled throughout Europe on foot, in extreme poverty and frequently ill, founding schools in the Netherlands, Italy, Germany, Austria, and in today's Czech Republic and Slovakia. The "Jesuitesses", as her congregation was designated by her opponents, were suppressed in 1631. In 1631 she was confined in a convent as a heretic on the instructions of the Pope. She then relied on her female friends to continue running the schools, using coded letter written in lemon juice as invisible ink to provide instructions.

== Return to England ==
In 1637, with letters of introduction from Pope Urban VIII to Queen Henrietta Maria of France, Mary returned to England and established herself in London. There she and her companions established free schools for the poor, nursed the sick and visited prisoners. In 1642 she journeyed northward with her household where they established a community school in Hutton Rudby, the home of cousin Sir Thomas Gascoigne, and then travelled to stay with the Thwing family at Heworth, near York. She died at Heworth Manor, on 20 January 1645 (old calendar) during the English Civil War.

After her death, her companions thought it best not to bury her body near the city centre where she died because of the dangers of desecration. Instead, they sought a less conspicuous place and found a solution by arranging for her to be buried in the churchyard of St Thomas' Church, Osbaldwick, about a mile away. There, as the record says, "the vicar was honest enough to be bribed". Her burial on 1 February 1645 was also attended by Anglicans and she was much admired and revered by many local people, both Catholic and Protestant. Her epitaph can be viewed inside the church, though she was buried in the cemetery of the Anglican church of Osbaldwick. The epitaph reads, "To love the poor, persevere in the same, live, die, and rise with them was all the aim of Mary Ward who having lived 60 years and 8 days. Died 30th January 1645".

== Legacy ==
Although her ideas were suppressed, her work was not destroyed. Later congregations of women looked to her for inspiration. Her ideas and work revived gradually and developed, following the general lines of the first scheme. The second institute was at length approved as to its Rule by Pope Clement XI in 1703, and as an institute by Pope Pius IX in 1877.

Ward was finally formally recognized as the founder of the two religious institutes by the Holy See in 1909. In 2002, the Congregation of Jesus was finally allowed to adopt the constitutions of the Jesuits, as well as the name she had originally intended for them.

Ward's writings were approved by theologians on 20 April 1932. Ward was declared venerable by Pope Benedict XVI on 19 December 2009, and he mentioned her the following year during his state visit to the United Kingdom.

By the twenty-first century, over 200 schools had been named after her and they form a worldwide network. For the 400th anniversary of her birth in 1985, the Mary Ward Catholic Secondary School in Toronto was named after her. A Catholic elementary school in Niagara Falls, Ontario is also carries her name. Schools in Germany named for her include, the Maria-Ward-Schule in Landau and the St. Marien-Schulen in Regensburg. In addition, there is the private St Mary's School, Cambridge in England, Loreto Toorak (Mandeville Hall) in Melbourne and Loreto Kirribilli in Sydney.

Her work is celebrated in an exhibit in the museum of the Bar Convent in York.

== Books about Mary Ward ==
In 1932, the Catholic author Ida Friederike Görres, who was educated by the Mary Ward sisters (as they were known) and who spent two years as a novice with this order in Austria, wrote a book in German about Mary Ward; this was translated into English in 1939 and later into other languages.

== Bibliography ==
- Kóhler, Mathilde: Maria Ward. Ein Frauenschicksal des 17. Jahrhunderts. Kósel Verlag, 1984
- Görres, Ida Friederike. Mary Ward, trans. Elsie Codd. London: Longmans, Green: 1939.
- Sr. Ursula Dirmeier, CJ, ed., Mary Ward und ihre Gründung: Die Quellentexte bis 1645 (Mary Ward and Her Foundation. The Source Texts to 1645), 4 vols, 2007, Münster 2007, Corpus Catholicorum, vols. 45–48. (in German)
- Immolata Wetter, Bernadette Ganne, Patricia Harriss, Mary Ward Under the Shadow of the Inquisition, 1630–1637, Way Books, 2006, ISBN 0-904717-28-3.
- Margaret Mary Littlehales. Mary Ward Pilgrim and Mystic Burns and Oates, 1998.
- Nigg, Walter: Mary Ward – Eine Frau gibt nicht auf. Römerhof Verlag, Zürich 2009. ISBN 978-3-905894-03-5 (in German)
