= Heworth, York =

Suburb of York, North Yorkshire, England

Coordinates: 53.969920°N 1.056500°W

Heworth
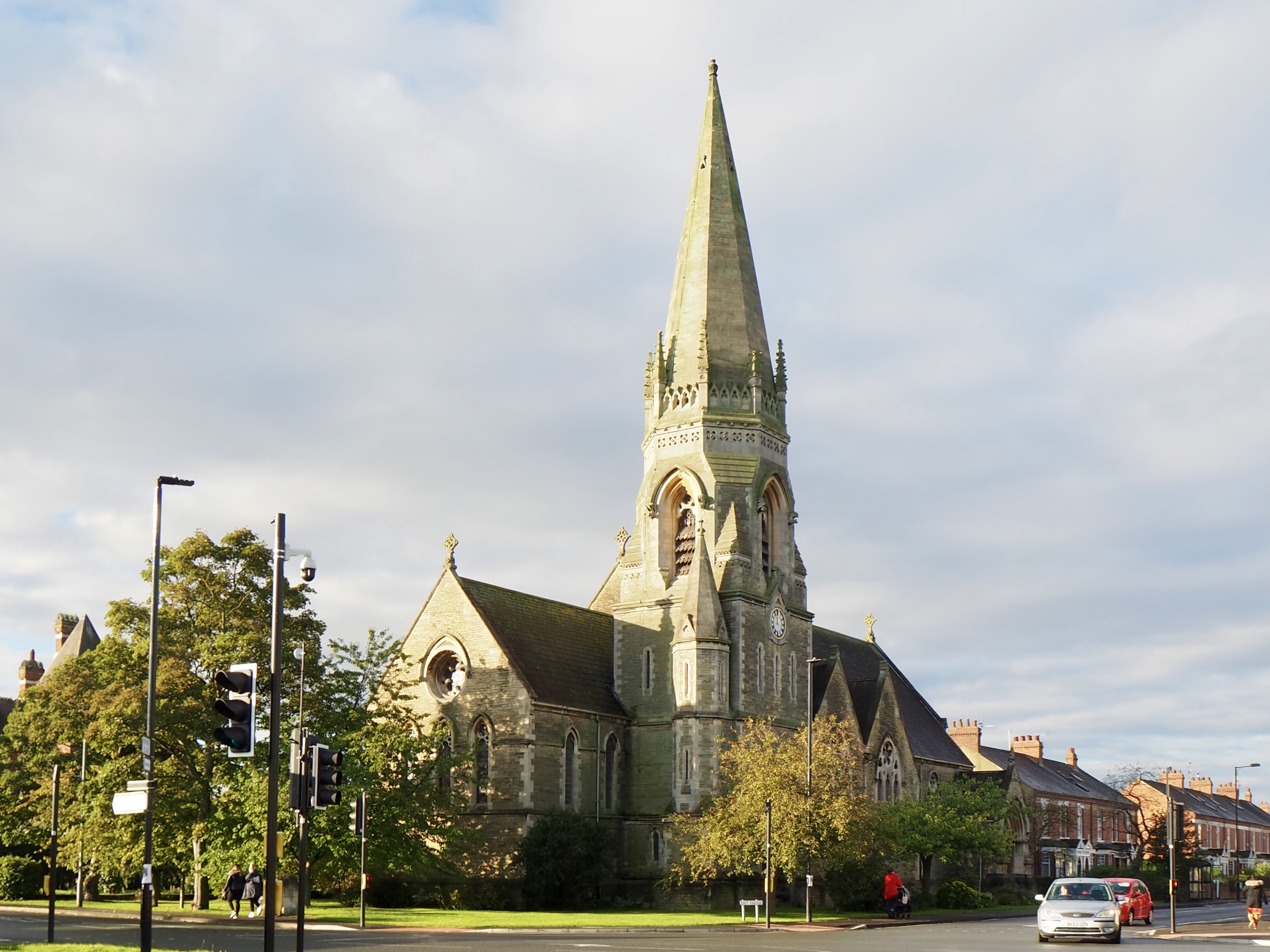
- Holy Trinity Church, Heworth

- Location within North Yorkshire
- Population: 13,725 (2011 census)
- OS grid reference: SE619530
- Unitary authority: City of York
- Ceremonial county: North Yorkshire
- Region: Yorkshire and the Humber
- Country: England
- Sovereign state: United Kingdom
- Post town: YORK
- Postcode district: YO31
- Dialling code: 01904
- Police: North Yorkshire
- Fire: North Yorkshire
- Ambulance: Yorkshire
- UK Parliament: York Central

Heworth (/ˈhjuːəθ/ HYOO-əth) is part of the city of York in North Yorkshire, England, about 1 mile (1.6 km) north-east of the centre. No longer in general referred to as a village, "Heworth Village" is now the name of a specific road. The name "Heworth" is Anglo-Saxon and means a "high enclosure".

== Location and demographics ==
Housing in Heworth varies from terraced houses along East Parade towards Layerthorpe, through large Victorian villas on Heworth Green, to older houses in Heworth village and the 1830s Elmfield Villa, home to Elmfield College and 1930s semi-detached houses on Stockton Lane.

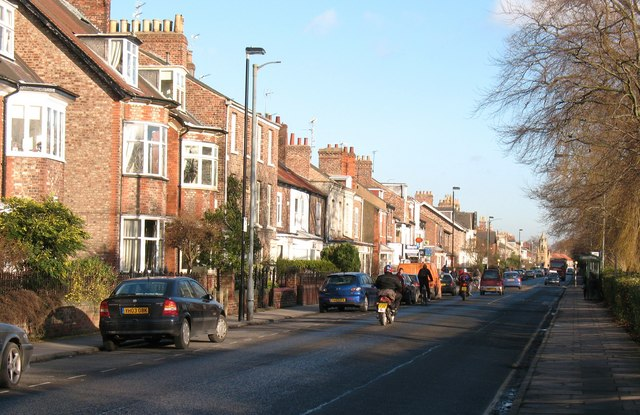
East Parade, Heworth

Heworth has seen much modern suburban development, particularly in the outlying area of Heworth Without.

Heworth splits into two wards for the purposes of local elections—Heworth (including all land within the old city boundary) and Heworth Without (outside the old city boundary). Heworth Holme is a popular open space near Heworth village.

The population of the Heworth Ward at the 2011 Census was 13,725.

== Transport ==
A number of bus routes serve Heworth, these are operated by First York, York & Country and East Yorkshire. It is roughly 1.5 miles from York station, which gives access to the UK national rail network.

== History ==
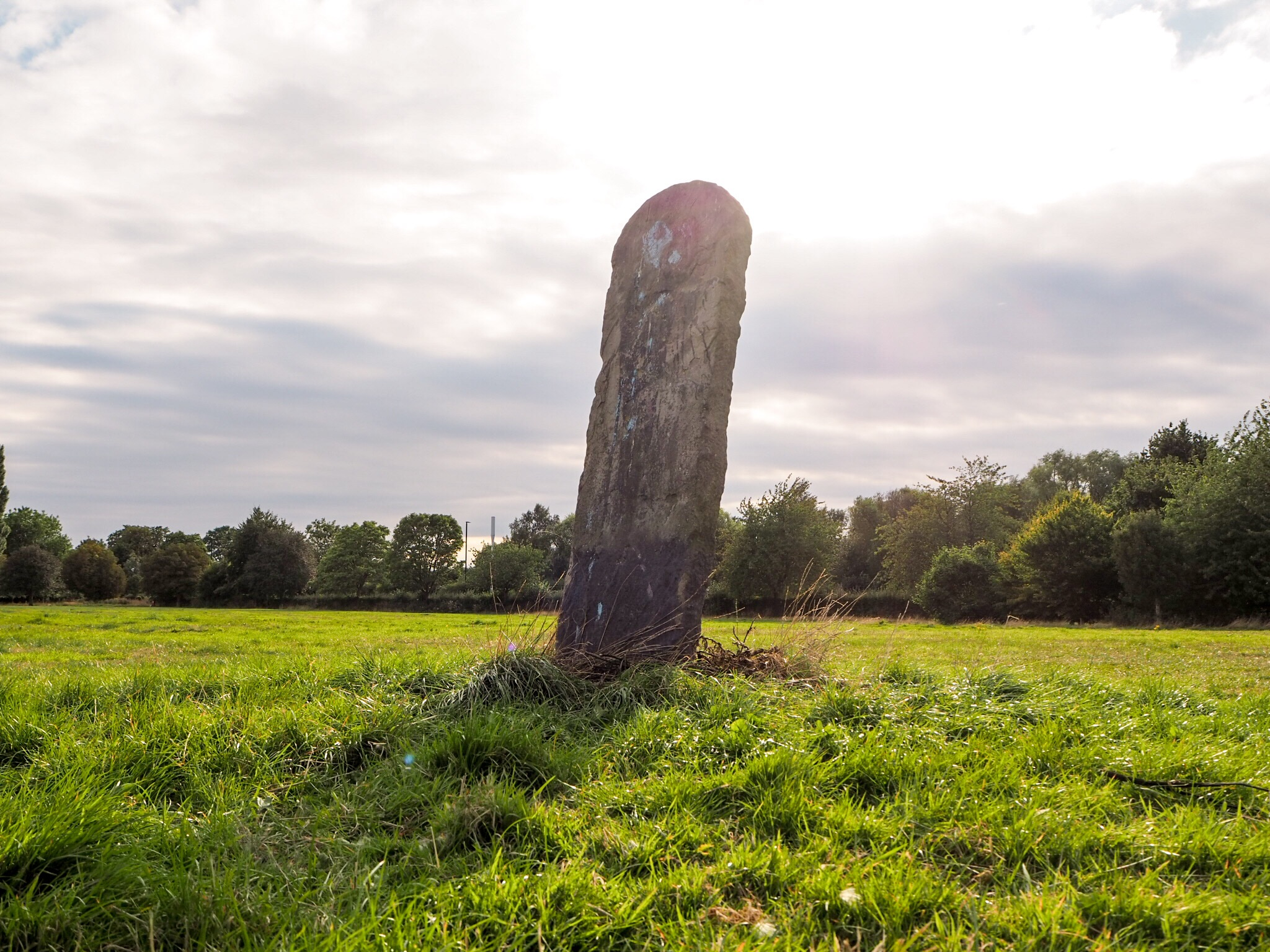
Boundary stone on Monk Stray

Very little is known about the prehistoric history of the Heworth area, some researchers believe the area was largely boggy land. The village is of Roman origin and two Roman cremation cemeteries have been found in the area. Heworth Green, the road from York city centre to the village, is on the site of a Roman road.

During the early Medieval period, contemporary burials took place in a similar area to the Roman ones; this was during the 5th and 6th centuries. However, evidence for settlement in Heworth during this period of time still remains minimal.

The village appears as Heworde in the Domesday Book of 1086, and as Hewud in 1219.

Heworth was formerly a township in the parishes of St Saviour, St Cuthbert and St Olave-Marygate. In 1866 Heworth became a separate civil parish. In 1894 the parish was abolished and split; the part in the County Borough of York became Heworth Within and the rural part became Heworth Without. In 1891 the parish had a population of 740. Until 1974 it was in the North Riding of Yorkshire.

=== 1453 Battle of Heworth Moor ===
On 24 August 1453, a skirmish took place and was the first meeting of the two families involved in the Percy-Neville feud, the feud which eventually helped provoke the Wars of the Roses. Historians have described an attack on the Neville family's wedding party by Lord Egremont; numerous contemporaries regard it as the very first military action of the Wars of the Roses.

The Neville family was returning to Sheriff Hutton castle following a wedding between Sir Thomas Neville and Maud Stanhope. Stanhope was the heiress and niece of Ralph de Cromwell. Cromwell had previously confiscated Percy strongholds such as Wressle and Bunwell after Henry 'Hotspur' Percy's death in 1403; the thought of those properties one day being handed over to the Neville family angered Lord Egremont greatly.

Egremont decided to ambush the Neville family's returning wedding party at Heworth Moor, along with 1,000 retainers from York. The Neville family were said to have given a good account of themselves and defended themselves well in the skirmish.

=== 1642 Meeting on Heworth Moor ===
During the summer of 1642 both the Parliamentary party and King Charles I negotiated with each other while preparing for war.

When Charles endeavoured to raise a guard for his own person at York, intending it, as the event afterwards proved, to form the nucleus of an army, Lord Fairfax was required by Parliament to present a petition to his sovereign, entreating Charles to hearken to the voice of his Parliament, and to discontinue the raising of troops. This was at a great meeting of the freeholders and farmers of Yorkshire convened by the king on Heworth Moor on 3 June near York. Charles evaded receiving the petition, pressing his horse forward, but Thomas Fairfax followed him and placed the petition on the pommel of the king's saddle.

=== Local enclosures ===
The lands called Monk Ward Stray consist of 131 acres and 38 perches of land, situate near York, and in the township of Heworth. Before the passing of an Enclosure Act 1817, the freemen of York, who were occupiers of houses within a division or ward of the city, called Monk Ward, were, together with certain other persons, entitled to common of pasture and right of stray or average, and had immemorially used and enjoyed the same, in and over a parcel of ground called Heworth Moor, of which G. A. Thweng, lord of the manor of Heworth, was then seised in fee; another piece of land, called Heworth Grange, of which the king was then seised in fee; and certain closes and other parcels of ground, called Hall Fields, of which E. Prest and others were then seised in fee.

=== Settlement ===
Construction of the Heworth Green Villas on Heworth Road began about 1817. Until the mid-19th century, the Lord of the Manor was the Reverend Robert William Bilton Hornby. The Ordnance Survey map of 1849, shows that Heworth was effectively a square of three parallel streets sandwiched between the then Scarborough Road and East Parade.

On the outskirts of the village near Monk Stray was Elmfield College, a Primitive Methodist foundation which existed from 1864 to 1932, when it merged with Ashville College in Harrogate. All that is left of the college now is numbers 1 and 9 Straylands Grove, next to Monk Stray, and staff housing along Elmfield Terrace and Willow Grove.

The church of Holy Trinity (architect: George Fowler Jones) was added in 1869; outlying features included a Wesleyan Chapel, the manor house, a public house (The Britannia), a windmill, several potteries, Heworth Hall and Heworth House. At that time Tang Hall was just that – a hall situated in parkland; since then it has developed into its own neighbourhood. Christ Church was built on Stockton Lane in 1964. Heworth became a Conservation Area in 1975.

== Notable buildings ==
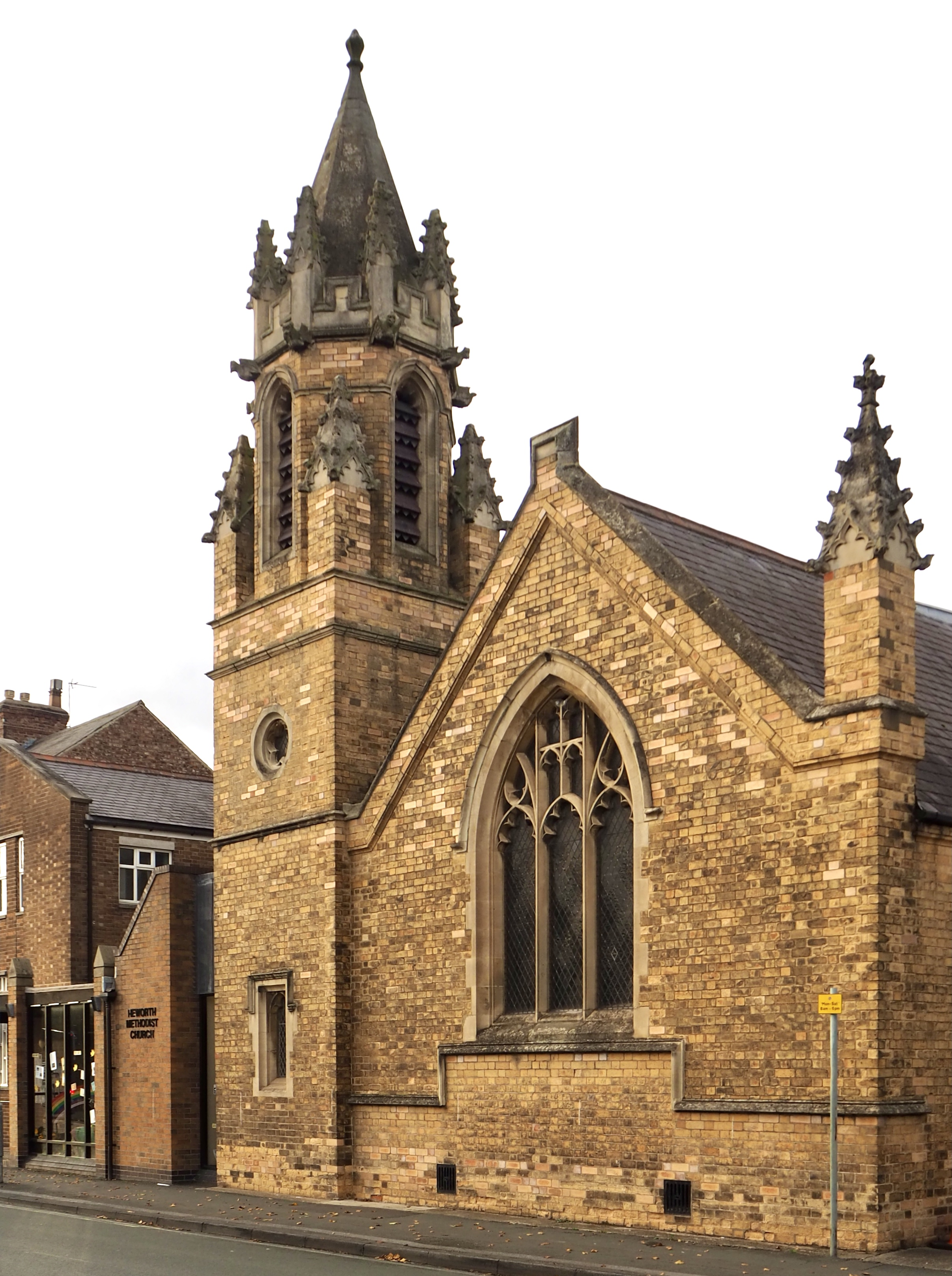
Heworth Methodist Church

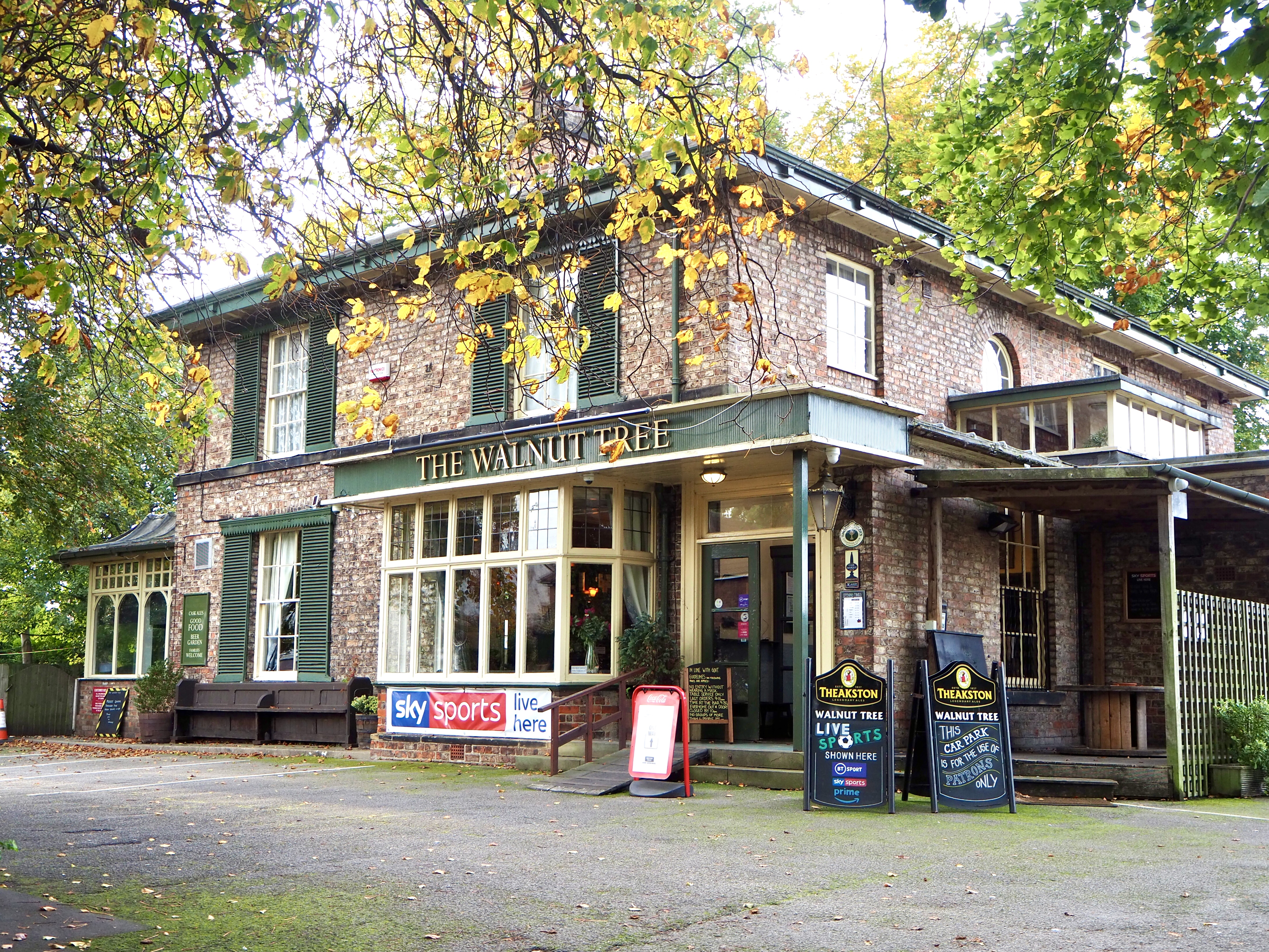
The Walnut Tree public house

- Heworth Manor (also called the Old Manor House or Heworth Hall), is said to have been located at what is now the corner of Heworth Village and Walney Road, it is now demolished. Occupied by the Catholic Recusant Thwenge/Thwing family during the time of Henry VIII, it was later sold to the family Agar. It was here that the Catholic priest Anthony Page (1563–1593) was found in a haystack and where the Catholic nun Mary Ward (1585–1645) is said to have died. Helen/Ellen Thwing (b.1636), nun, was in charge of the house and in 1678 it was purchased by Sir Thomas Gascoigne (Helen's uncle) "for my niece Ellen" when Sir George Thwenge (Helen's father) was forced to sell due to unrelated financial difficulties. A Catholic community thrived at the house and it was central to the happenings of the so-called "Barnbow Plot," the foundations of the Dolebank and Bar Convent and was a seat of Mary Ward's Institute of the Blessed Virgin Mary whose founding members, outside those of the family, had lived here as early as 1643. Helen's brother, the priest and martyr Thomas Thwing, chaplain at Carlton Hall, became chaplain at Heworth and was arrested here in 1679. It was a registered Papists' Estate and described thus: "William Thweng... the Mannour of Heworth ... a capital messge., with barn &c, two fronsteads and two gardens ..." During the 19th century it was owned by the Hornby family, Anglicans.
- The Cottage, No. 11 Stockton Lane, dates from c. 1800 and appears to be on Robert Cooper's map of 1832. It was called Belle Vue Cottage in 1834, when it was occupied by Mr. John Scott, in 1846, when it was occupied by Henry Janson, gent., and in 1850 (Directories; OS). It is a double-fronted cottage with rendered walls and a hipped roof and was extended c. 1840. It has an enriched door-case of mid 18th-century date, brought from elsewhere.
- The Manor House, No. 1 Stockton Lane, was formerly called the New Manor House (OS). It was built before 1830 when William Hornby Esq. (father of Robert Hornby) occupied it and it appears, with its name, on Robert Cooper's map of 1832. The house is partly of two, partly of three, storeys, above a high semi-basement and is of unusual, nearly cubical, shape. A bay window was added later in the 19th century.
- Rose Villa, No. 32/34 Stockton Lane, was called Heworth Villa in 1850 (OS). It was built in the early 19th century and may be the house which appears on the site on Robert Cooper's map of 1832. It is a double-fronted house with later extensions.
- The old Elmfield College (b. 1840s) still has one building standing (on Straylands Grove)
- Heworth House in Melrosegate was built in 1865 as the old Heworth Rectory. It was designed by G. Fowler Jones and is representative of high Victorian Gothic architecture.
- Holy Trinity Church, built in 1869, was designed by G. Fowler Jones, commissioned by the Reverend Jocelyn Willey of Camblesforth Hall, and his wife, Frances Carus-Wilson (later Lady Trevor Wheler).

== Sport ==
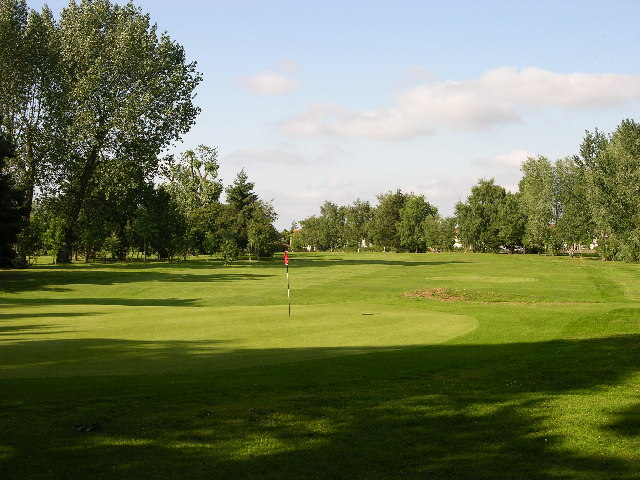
Heworth Golf Course

Heworth has some history in the sports of cricket, football, rugby league and others. Heworth Cricket Club is said to have been founded in 1784 (in 2009 they celebrated their 225th anniversary). The football club was one of the earliest to play in the York area, and featured in the York Football League from 1898 onwards. They finished as runners-up of the top level during the 1908–09, 1909–10 and 1911–12 seasons.

Elmpark Way in the village has hosted the York International 9s competition since 2002. It is an annual rugby league nines competition and in the past has featured clubs from England, France and Russia. It has been given a five-star rating by the Rugby League European Federation.

== Notable people ==
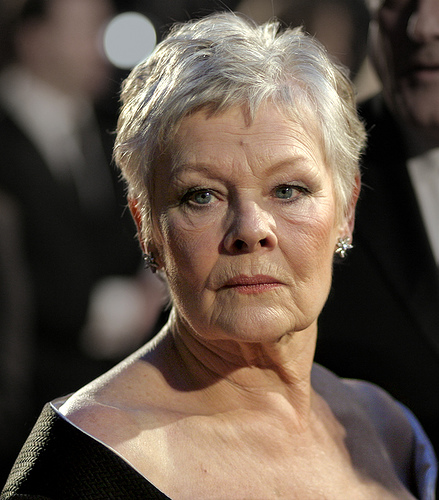
Judi Dench was born in Heworth.

See also people associated with Elmfield College.

- Dame Judi Dench. born in Heworth Green
- Robert William Bilton Hornby, priest, antiquarian and lord of the manor of Heworth
- Claudia Lawrence (born in Malton, missing since March 2009), moved to Heworth in 2007
- Barbara Ward, economist, writer and environmentalist; Dame Commander of the Order of the British Empire; born here in 1914
- Mary Ward, English Roman Catholic nun and founder of the Sisters of Loreto (also known as the Institute of the Blessed Virgin Mary), moved to the village in 1643 after a brief stint in Hutton Rudby (1642–3). During the dangers of the English Civil War she was forced to move within the York City Walls but moved back to Heworth in July 1644. Ill for some time, Ward died on 30 January 1645 (20 January 1645, Old Calendar) at the Manor House (see Heworth Manor below) which, under the aid of the Thwing sisters (Ellen, Anne and Catherine) would become one of the temporary seats of the order, prior to the establishment of the Bar Convent. She is buried in Osbaldwick Churchard.
