= Bar Convent =

Grade I listed building in York, England

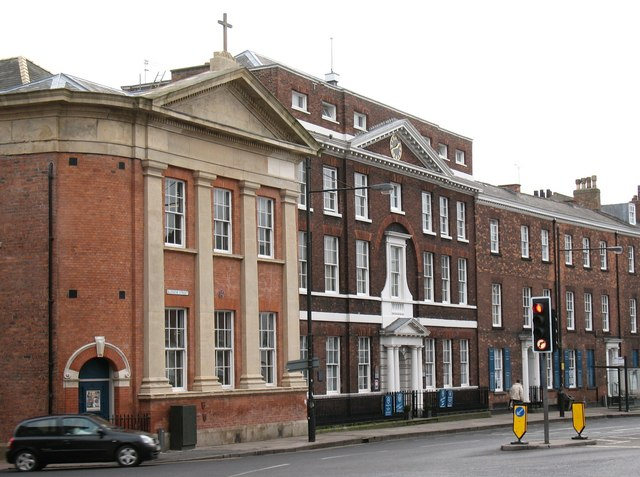

Religion
- Affiliation: Catholic Church
- Ecclesiastical or organisational status: Convent
- Status: Active

Location
- Location: Blossom Street, York, England
- Country: England
- Interactive map of Bar Convent
- Coordinates: 53.95487°N 1.09180°W

Architecture
- Architects: Thomas Atkinson, G. T. Andrews
- Style: Georgian, Neoclassical
- Direction of façade: East

Website
- barconvent.co.uk

The Bar Convent Living Heritage Centre, at Micklegate Bar in York, England, was established in 1686 and is the oldest surviving Catholic convent in the British Isles. The laws of England at the time prohibited the foundation of Catholic convents, and as a result the community was both established and operated in secret. While pretending to be widows, the founders opened the first school for girls in the country in Hammersmith, London, in 1679, and the second at the Bar Convent. Today, the Bar Convent is a popular destination for visitors to York and offers bed and breakfast accommodation, meeting rooms, a gift shop, café, and a museum exhibition about the convent's history.

== History ==
=== Origin and early years ===
After seeing the good work that the sisters were doing in London, Yorkshireman Sir Thomas Gascoigne, a fervent Roman Catholic, approached Mother Frances Bedingfield and declared "we must have a school for our daughters". Gascoigne even went as far as providing a gift of £450, part of which purchased a property on the Convent site and a boarding school, and day school, for Catholic girls was set up at the site by the nuns.

The order was a target for frequent discrimination, leading in 1694 to the incarceration of Mother Frances and her great niece in Ousebridge Gaol. They were released shortly after but two years later, in 1696, the house was attacked and severely damaged by an angry mob. The engraving of St Michael over the front door is to commemorate this, with a local legend stating that St Michael appeared over the house riding a horse and the mob, terrified, fled the scene.

The convent later came under attack from Doctor Jaques Sterne, a religious campaigner who ordered the convent be shut down and the children at the school sent home. The situation culminated in Mother Hodshon and a colleague being summoned before the Spiritual Court to answer charges of not receiving Anglican holy communion at Holy Trinity Church. The case fell apart, largely due to no service being carried out that day and was thrown out. Doctor Sterne would go on to become a staunch ally and supporter of the Convent following this incident.

Mother Bedingfeld was recalled to Germany in 1699 and the original intention was that Mary Portington would succeed her. However, a family lawsuit made it politically difficult for Portington to take the post and the role fell instead to Dorothy Bedingfield (née Baston), whose reign coincided with a period of intense poverty and this, combined with her own unpopularity, meant that her 34-year reign was turbulent.

=== 18th century ===
Under Mother Ann Aspinal, the convent was expanded and rebuilt, culminating in the original property being effectively demolished and rebuilt with the order moving to a neighbouring house for two years. The foundation stone for the new house was laid on 4 March 1766 and the house was covered by December 1768. Mother Aspinal also presided over the construction of what is described in the building licence as, "A new front wall to her house". What Mother Aspinal built was an entire extra level to the house, a Georgian Facade that added an extra set of rooms to the front of the house. A copy of the licence, granted by Lord Peter Johnson, then Mayor, can be viewed in the Convent's archives.

Chapel of the Bar Convent

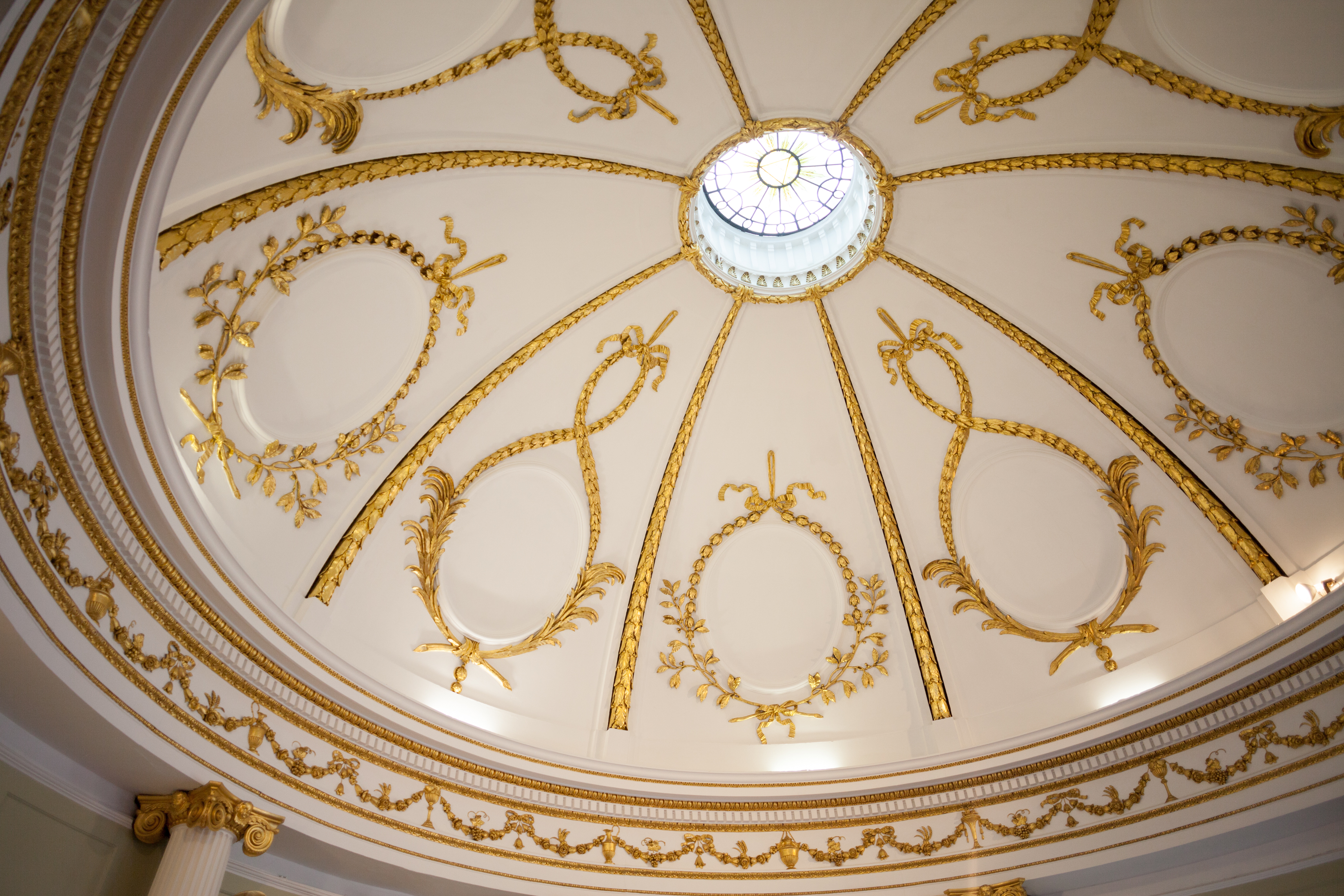
Detail on the centre of the chapel dome

The most significant addition to the new Convent was a Chapel. Mother Aspinal initially wanted the design to reflect Roman churches and hired Thomas Atkinson, the architect responsible for the Neo Gothic additions to Bishopthorpe Palace to do the work. However, due to the continuing hostility to Catholicism, Atkinson took the decision to modify the initial design, incorporating it into the structure of the house itself.

Instead of the dome Mother Aspinal intended, the dome was concealed beneath a slate roof, meaning it was hidden from the street. Atkinson also built eight different escape routes into the chapel, to ensure that if the building was stormed, the worshippers would be able to escape. The chapel was completed in 1769.

The passing of the First Catholic Repeal Act in 1778 made life easier for the Convent as it allowed them to practise legally and legalised Catholic schools. This led to a new climate of religious freedom within Britain that allowed the nuns to wear the religious habit for the first time since the creation of the Convent. The passing of the Roman Catholic Relief Act 1791 in turn led to the Bar Convent being granted a licence to act as a public place of worship for the first time in its history.

During the Napoleonic Wars the Convent found itself providing shelter to émigré priests from the continent. Mother Superior Catherine Rouby, the Superior at the time, also provided shelter to fugitive nuns including Carmelites from Brabant, Canonesses of the Holy Sepulchre from Liège and Poor Clares from Dunkirk.

Émigré families also sent their daughters to the school and several stayed on to become nuns in the community. The conflict and its aftermath led to the Convent being cut off from the Institute of the Blessed Virgin in Germany. As a result, Mother Superior Elizabeth Coyney petitioned the pope to have the convent put under the authority of the Northern Vicar Apostolic, Bishop Gibson.

=== 20th century ===
Mother Mary Aikenhead, foundress of the Sisters of Charity, was a novice there for three years (1812–1815). The convent was bombed during the Second World War, leading to the death of five nuns and the destruction of the East Wing.

The order continued to maintain a school on the site until 1985, when control was handed over to the Middlesbrough diocese and it was renamed as All Saints School. The convent, however, is still involved in the Catholic life of the 'Outstanding' academy.

== Architecture ==
=== Exterior ===
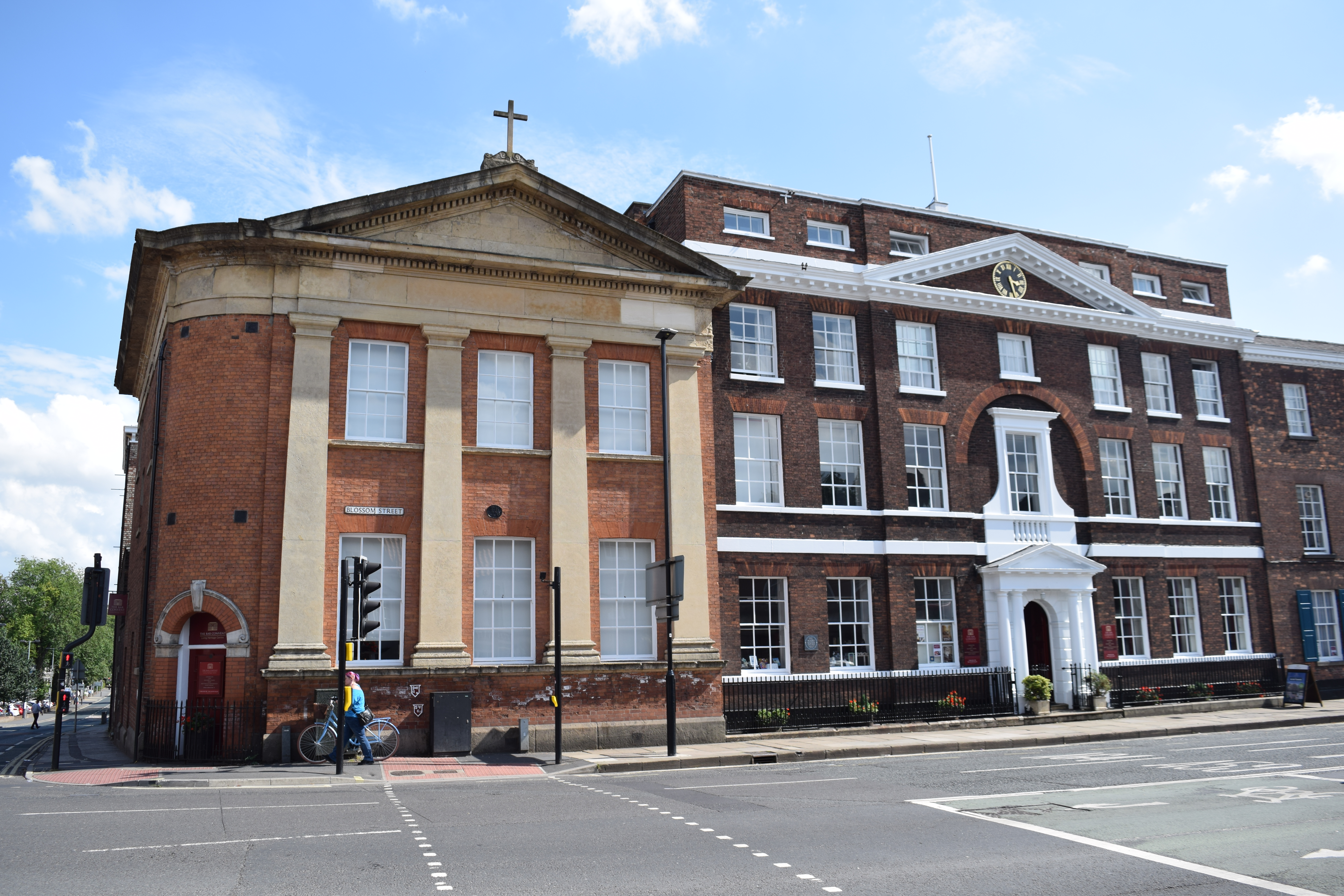
Exterior view of the Bar Convent on Blossom Street

The main building of the convent has three storeys, with an attic, facing directly onto Blossom Street. The front façade has seven bays, the central three of which project slightly forward from the others. There are 12-pane sash windows on the ground floor. The one which is directly above the doorcase is set in a shouldered surround with a balustrade below the window and a moulded cornice above it.

At the rear of the building, there is a three-storey, three-bay pent-roofed extension which houses a square clock tower. The tower itself is crowned with an ogee roofed open cupola and timber columns. The schoolroom block of the main building has two storeys and a three-bay front. The windows are once again 12-pane sashes with differences in size and moulding between the first and second floors. All the windows have flat arches of rubbed brick.

=== Interior ===
The Entrance Hall to the main building was initially built as an open courtyard but has since been enclosed and Victorian tiles added. The court has a decorative tiled floor and a glass roof supported by iron trusses which are, in turn, supported by iron columns. The court also houses a clock, designed by Henry Hindley. It was connected in around 1970 to the pediment clock on the building's frontage, on Blossom Street. The Great Parlour, which features paintings of some of the notable early sisters of the convent, is located to the right of the ground floor and has a marble fireplace with round headed alcoves to each side.

=== Chapel ===
The chapel block has two storeys and two attics. It has a five-bay front end that is masked by extensions housing the Lady Chapel and a staircase. The ground floor has two windows containing four round-headed Gothic lights, while the first floor has three windows with central pivoted lights.

The chapel's interior houses a stone staircase with square iron balusters that leads up to the chapel on the first floor. The chapel itself contains a domed sanctuary, a nave with three bays and a north and south transept. The sanctuary is a domed rotunda with eight detached and fluted columns and a frieze depicting features such as vine leaves, urns and posies. The dome itself has eight bays, each of which features garlands of various fruits and foliage and is topped by a painted glass lantern.

The south transept leads into the Lady Chapel which is lit by a small dome and cupola. Beneath the north transept is a square space which may once have served as a priest hole. The altar dates from 1969 but uses scrolled legs featuring winged cherub heads from the 18th-century original. Behind the altar is a 20th-century reredos which is topped by 18th-century carved figures of Saint Jerome, Saint Ambrose, Saint Augustine and Saint Gregory which support a Spanish Ivory crucifix.

== Present day ==
The Bar Convent is England's oldest living convent, still home to a resident community of sisters (who belong to the Congregation of Jesus). The Grade I listed buildings were widely renovated in 2015 and now house a museum exploring the history of the convent and the community, as well as a café, meeting rooms and a guest house.

== See also ==
- Christina Kenworthy-Browne
- Grade I listed buildings in the City of York
- Listed buildings in York (outside the city walls, southern part)
