= Sir Thomas Gascoigne, 2nd Baronet =

English Baronet

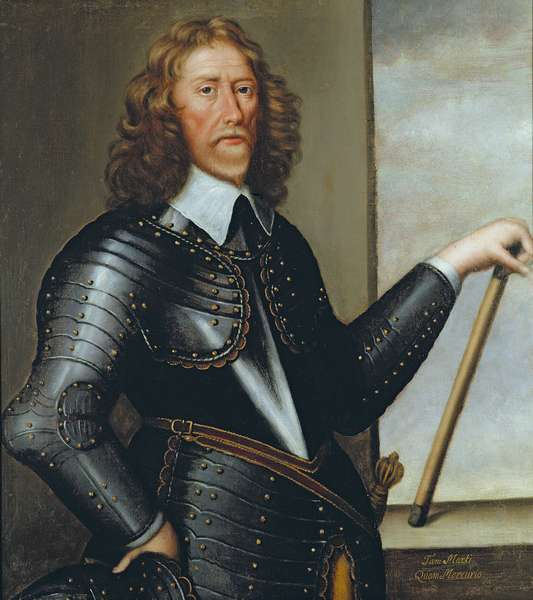
Sir Thomas Gascoigne, 2nd Baronet.

Sir Thomas Gascoigne, 2nd Baronet (1596–1686) was an English Baronet, a prominent member of the Gascoigne family and a survivor of the Popish Plot, or as it was locally known "the Barnbow Plot".

== Background ==
He was the eldest son of Sir John Gascoigne, 1st Baronet, of Barnbow and Parlington Hall, Yorkshire, the head of a devoutly Roman Catholic family (Sir John himself was a convert to Catholicism), and his wife Anne Ingelby of Lawkland Hall. As was common with Yorkshire recusant families then, nearly all of Thomas's younger siblings entered the religious life, apart from his sister Anne, who married George Thwing, and was the mother of the martyr Fr. Thomas Thwing. One of his sisters Catherine Gascoigne went abroad to become an abbess at Cambrai and Justina was prioress of the convent in Paris when she died on 17 May 1690. Three of his sons took religious orders including John (1598–1681) who became the abbot of the Benedictines at Lamspringe Abbey.

After succeeding to the title in 1637 Sir Thomas spent much of his life quietly managing his estates and his lucrative colliery: during the Popish Plot, a major part of his defence against the charge of conspiracy was that he almost never left home, and had not been in London for many years, so that his value as a conspirator was non-existent. He was also a generous patron of the Franciscan order at their house near Thirsk.

== Popish (Barnbow) Plot ==
During the Popish Plot, (known locally as the Barnbow Plot, from the Gascoigne family estate of that name), he was accused of conspiracy to kill King Charles II by two disgruntled former employees, Bolron and Mowbray, but was acquitted, and retired to spend his last years in Germany.

As J.P. Kenyon remarks, even in the general atmosphere of anti-Catholic hysteria created by the Popish Plot, it is difficult to see how the authorities could have taken seriously such accusations against a man who was nearly 85, deaf and almost blind, who rarely visited London and indeed had scarcely left his own estate for the past 30 years. Gascoigne, ordered to stand his trial in London, sensibly demanded to be tried by a Yorkshire jury. The delay in bringing the jury down allowed him time to prepare his defence; and the judges admitted that the jurors were better equipped to decide on the credibility of witnesses, most of whom the jurors knew personally, than were the judges themselves.

By the spring of 1680, the hysteria caused by the Popish Plot was waning. The judges who tried Gascoigne, Sir William Dolben and Sir Edward Atkyns, showed more impartiality than in earlier Plot trials, admitted that the jury might find the accusers, Bolron and Mowbray, to be unreliable witnesses. Gascoigne was held in high regard by his Protestant neighbours, several of whom travelled to London to testify on his behalf. As Kenyon notes, it is interesting that the Court heard evidence about the Franciscan house at Mount Grace, Thirsk, of which Gascoigne was patron, and a great deal was said about the convent at Dolebank, near Ripon, founded by his daughter Anne Tempest, but it seems that the judges did not regard this promotion of the Catholic faith as treasonable (as the related trial of Mary Pressicks also suggests). In theory, it was a serious offence to give money for the support of a Catholic house of religion, but in practice, the Crown would generally turn a blind eye to it: the monastery at Mount Grace even survived the Plot. In notable contrast to earlier trials, the judges made it clear that they would not press for a guilty verdict, and in the circumstances, the jury had little difficulty in acquitting Gascoigne. They came in for severe criticism as a result, but public opinion gradually swung back in favour of the Catholic community. Most of Gascoigne's alleged co-conspirators, who were supposed to have signed a mythical document called "the Bloody Oath of Secrecy", were acquitted, except for Gascoigne's nephew, the priest Thomas Thwing, who was executed for conspiracy, despite the logical difficulty of a conspiracy without any other conspirators. and the Yorkshire part of the Popish Plot fizzled out. In the case of Gascoigne's neighbour and co-accused Mary Pressicks, the Court gave an interesting ruling that she was legally entitled to publicly advocate the conversion of England to the Roman Catholic faith.

However, his nephew Thomas Thwing was also charged, although as something of an afterthought to implicate more of Gascoigne's relatives. The prosecution made much of a so-called "list of conspirators", which in reality were individuals who had subscribed to support the new convent at Dolebank which Gascoigne's daughter Lady Tempest had recently founded, and where three of Thwing's sisters were nuns. Being a priest, Thwing was the only one found guilty. The King at first reprieved him, but owing to a remonstrance of the Commons the death warrant was issued on the day after the meeting of Parliament. Thwing was hung, drawn, and quartered at the Tyburn in York on 23 October 1680. J.P. Kenyon observed that Thwing was executed for conspiracy, despite the logical difficulty of a conspiracy without any other conspirators.

== Death and family ==
Gascoigne left England for good shortly after his acquittal and settled in Germany. He died in 1686 at Lamspringe Abbey near Hildesheim, a Benedictine house of which his brother John, who died in 1681, had been Abbot. By his wife Anne Symeon of Brightwell, Oxfordshire, he had eight surviving children, including his heir Sir Thomas Gascoigne, 3rd Baronet, and Anne, who married Sir Stephen Tempest. Like her father Anne was tried, but acquitted for alleged complicity in the Popish Plot. Two younger daughters, Catherine and Frances, became nuns.

He left £450 (c. £38,000 at 2010 valuation, with the purchasing power of 5,054 days of a craftsman's wages in the building trade.) that helped found the Bar Convent at Micklegate Bar in York. This money was also put towards the creation of Bar Convent Girls School, the first Catholic school for girls in England. The school survives as a mixed secondary school, All Saints Roman Catholic School.

The British consul at Amsterdam, who visited him at his last refuge in Lamspringe Abbey, called him "a very good, harmless gentleman", who was clearly innocent of the crimes of which he had been accused.

Baronetage of Nova Scotia
Preceded by John Gascoigne	Baronet (of Barnbow); 1637–1686	Succeeded by Thomas Gascoigne
