= Allis (surname) =

Allis is a surname. Notable people with the surname include:

- Conor Allis (born 1990), Irish hurler
- Edward P. Allis (businessman) (1824–1889), American businessman
- Edward Phelps Allis (zoologist) (1851–1947), American zoologist
- Charles David Allis (1951–2023), American molecular biologist
- Gilbert J. Allis (c.1879–1932), British philatelist
- Janine Allis (born 1965), Australian businesswoman
- John Allis (born 1942), American cyclist
- Harry Allis (1928–2006), American football player
- Louis Allis (1916–1994), American politician
- Louis Allis (golfer) (1866–1950), American golfer
- Mary Allis (1899–1987), American dealer of art and antiques
- Oswald Thompson Allis (1880–1973), American theologian and academic
- Thomas Allis (1788–1875), British osteologist and curator
- Thomas Henry Allis (1817–1870), British entomologist
- Victor Allis (born 1965), Dutch computer scientist
- William Allis (1901–1999), American physicist
