= Edward P. Allis =

Edward P. Allis may refer to:

- Edward P. Allis (businessman) (1824–1889), American businessman
- Edward Phelps Allis (zoologist) (1851–1947), his son, comparative anatomist and evolutionary morphologist
