= Osbaldwick =

Village and civil parish in North Yorkshire, England

Coordinates: 53.9585°N 1.0365°W

Osbaldwick: Osso
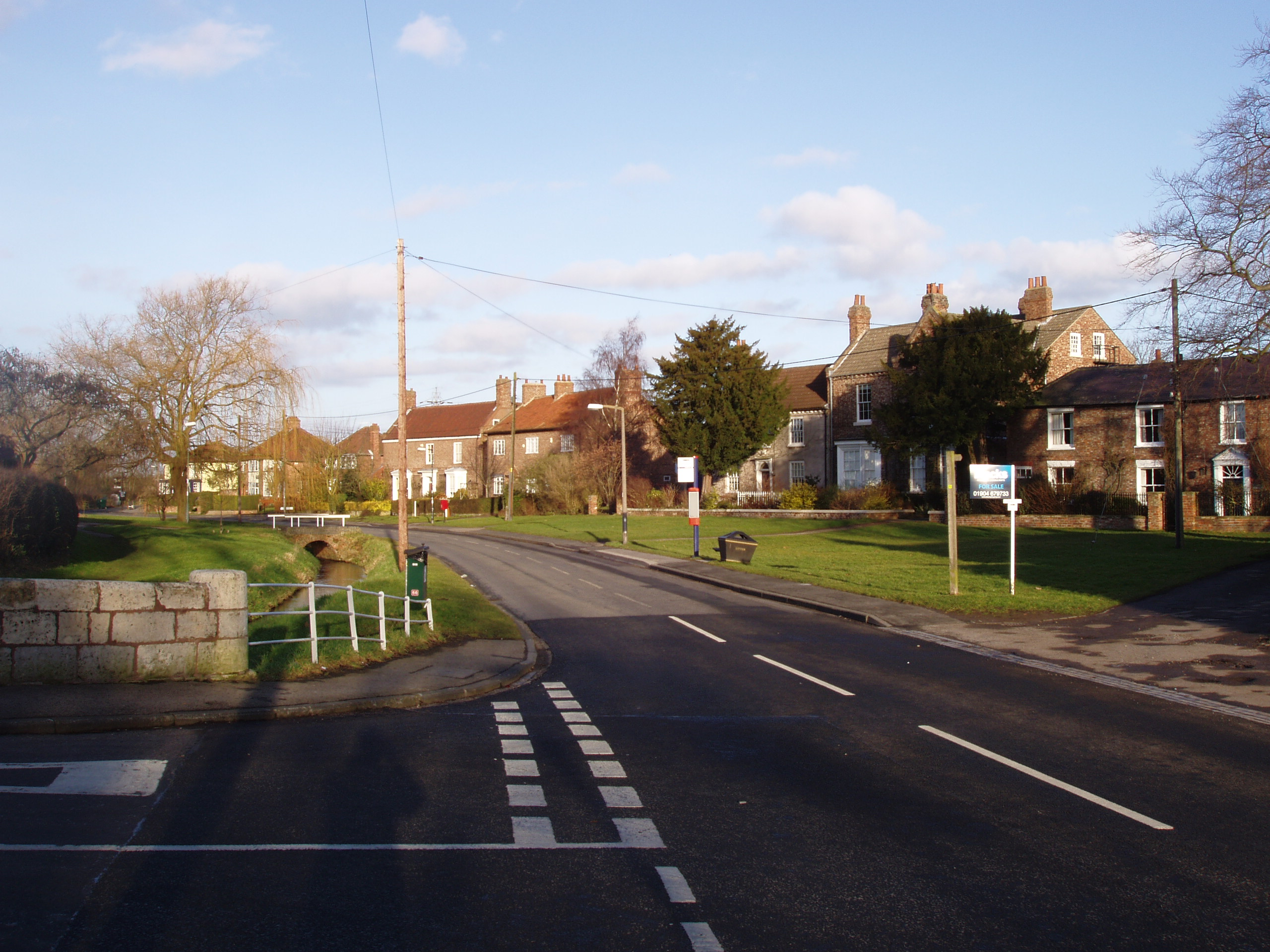
- Osbaldwick village

- Arms of Osbaldwick

- Location within North Yorkshire
- Population: 2,902 (2011)
- OS grid reference: SE634518
- Civil parish: Osbaldwick
- Unitary authority: City of York
- Ceremonial county: North Yorkshire
- Region: Yorkshire and the Humber
- Country: England
- Sovereign state: United Kingdom
- Post town: YORK
- Postcode district: YO10
- Police: North Yorkshire
- Fire: North Yorkshire
- Ambulance: Yorkshire
- UK Parliament: York Outer

Osbaldwick (/ˈɒzbəldwɪk/ OZ-bəld-wick) is a village and civil parish in the unitary authority of the City of York in North Yorkshire, England. Situated 2 miles (3.2 km) east of York, Osbaldwick is nowadays generally considered one of York's suburbs, though parts of it retain its historic character.

== History ==
In prehistory, the area around Osbaldwick comprised sandy heaths, forests and peaty carrs. It is hypothesised that Hull Road, south of the village, may already have been a routeway at this point, in which case settlement of the environs may go back millennia. A 3rd century Roman coin has been found a few hundred metres east of the village. Osbaldwick (and its name) were certainly in existence by the 11th century: it is mentioned three times in the Domesday Book as Osboldewic. The name derives from Osbald (an Old English forename) and wic (an Old English word meaning "dwelling-place"). Some sources claim that the Osbald in question is Osbald of Northumbria.

When the Domesday Book was written, the manor of Osbaldwick was assessed with the city of York, and its lands were held by the Church of St Peter, York. The office Prebendary of Osbaldwick was created, likely by Thomas of Bayeux, the first Norman archbishop of York. The prebendary was de facto lord of the manor. The earliest-known mention of an incumbent of this office is an M. Brand in 1205. Osbaldwick was probably within the royal Forest of Galtres at this time.

By medieval times, Osbaldwick Lane and Osbaldwick Village existed as routeways. The western half of the rectangle formed by these streets was a moated site known as Hall Garth up to the 19th century, and Moat Field thereafter. It is theorised that there once stood a moated demesne manor house there, (perhaps even a pre-Norman one). In the 1960s, the moat was filled in and houses were built atop the site.

Throughout the medieval period, land (and even the church) in Osbaldwick was appropriated to the prebend of Strensall. The first reference to enclosure in Osbaldwick dates from 1648, when petition was made for the village's common arable land to be divided. Two years later, this was realised in fields named Garend Field and Townend Field. Further place-names from around this time include Haverclose, Roughill Field Closes, The Slacke and Butt Leyes. Further enclosures happened in 1769. The fields north of the village still maintain their long, thin medieval shapes. They are primarily pastoral, and have been for hundreds of years.

In 1842, the Church finally sold the manor. It was bought by William Richardson. The estate was sold again in 1852 to Thomas Samuel Watkinson, later the Lord Mayor of York.

Three bombs fell on the village during the Second World War, each from a single plane on the night of 7 August 1940. Two landed on fields and caused no damage. The third landed on Osbaldwick Lane, killing a woman called Jean Abbot and injuring two others. During the conflict a bomb shelter was erected at the Derwent County Primary.

The centre of the village was declared a conservation area in 1978.

== Governance ==
The village was historically within the Bulmer wapentake of the North Riding of Yorkshire. When the latter county was distestablished in 1974, it was then a part of the district of Ryedale in North Yorkshire. Since 1996 it has been part of the City of York unitary authority.

Since 2010, the village has been within the York Outer UK Parliament constituency. Prior to that it had lain within Yorkshire (−1832), North Riding of Yorkshire (1832–1885) Thirsk and Malton (1885–1983), Selby (1983–1997) and Ryedale (1997–2010).

It is also part of the Osbaldwick and Derwent Ward within York Unitary Authority.

== Geography ==
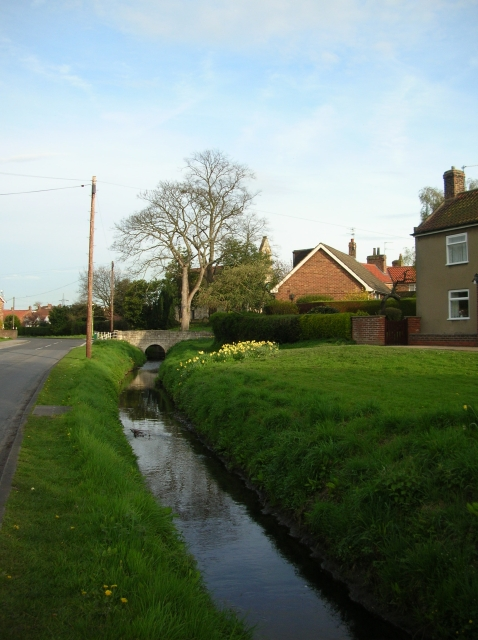
Osbaldwick Beck

The village proper lies around the rectangle of streets formed by Osbaldwick Village and Osbaldwick Lane. At its heart is a village green with a road running through. Newer housing surrounds the rectangle, and Osbaldwick is now effectively bounded on three sides by Hull Road to the south, the A64 (that forms part of York's ring road) to the east and by green-belt land to the north. To the west, newer housing merges into the Tang Hall district.

Small industrial and trading estates exist to the east of the village (heading towards Murton), and along Osbaldwick Link Road which links it to the A1079. Organisations based here include the Yorkshire Gardens Trust, Brew York and Shouksmiths. There is also a high-voltage substation. A 2006 housing development named Beckett Drive was built by Wimpey Homes by Osbaldwick Link Road on the site of a farm building and surrounding fields. A larger development, originally named New Osbaldwick and later named Derwenthorpe, was granted planning permission on 10 May 2007 for green-belt land north of the village. Some farmland also exists between Osbaldwick and Murton.

Osbaldwick Beck runs through the village green, and is part of the tributary system of the River Foss.

== Demography ==
The 1881 UK census recorded the population as 340. This number barely varied over the 19th century. However, as a result of new estates being built and York's slum clearances of the 1920s and 30s, the population rose to almost 2,000 by 1931. As of the 2001 UK census, the parish had a population of 2,726, of whom 2,299 were over the age of sixteen years and 1,115 were in employment. There were 1,200 dwellings of which 364 were detached. The population of the civil parish as taken at the 2011 census was 2,902. Latterly, because of Osbaldwick's proximity to the University of York, it has started to take on the character of a student quarter.

== Transport ==
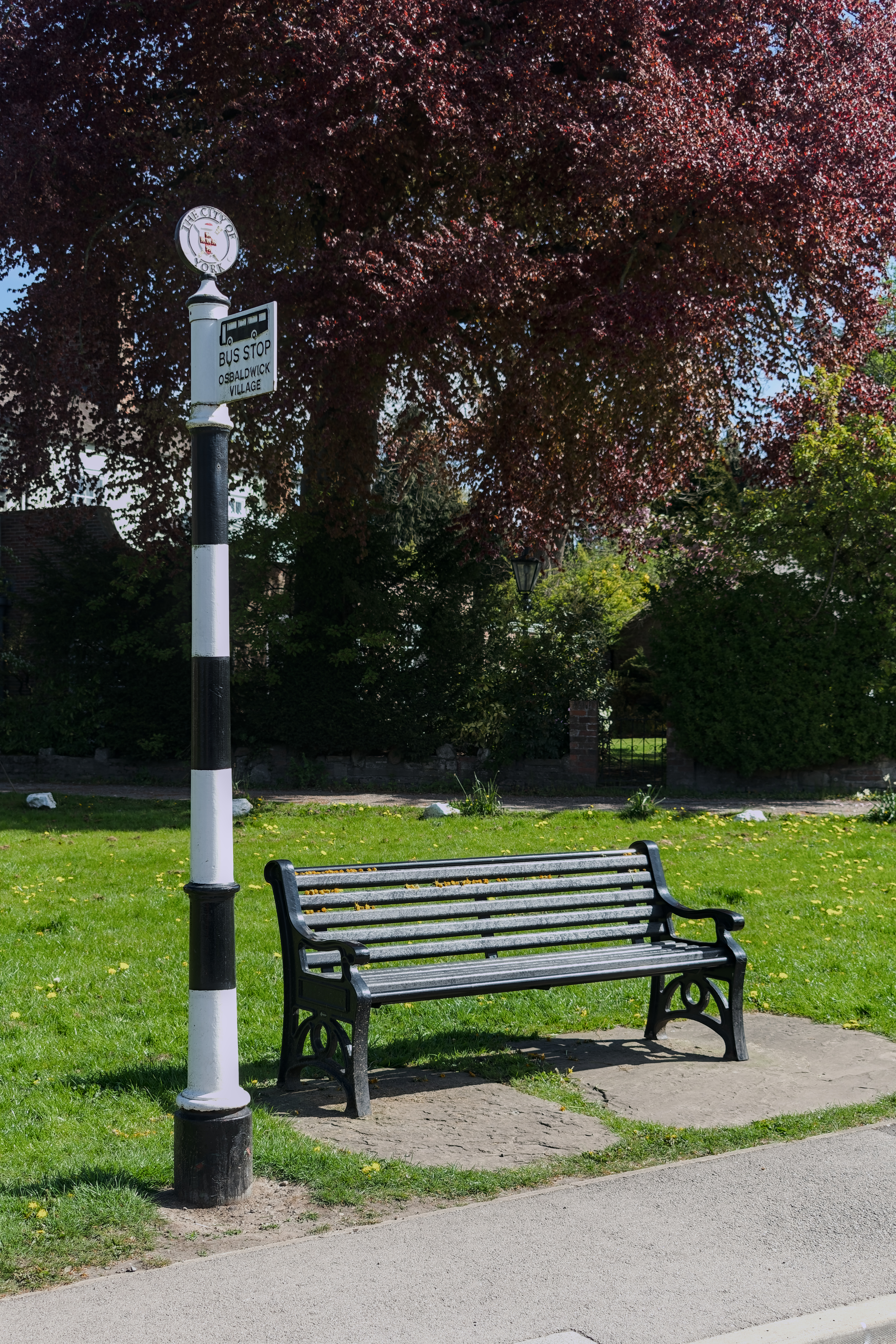
A heritage-style bus stop

Osbaldwick is served by two bus routes. First York's service 6 operates between Clifton Moor retail park and the University of York's east campus. Transdev York's less-frequent service 20 runs to Rawcliffe. Further buses (including EastRider ones) operate along the A1079. The bus stops in the village centre are built to a heritage style.

Between 1913 and 1915 Osbaldwick was served by a station on the Derwent Valley Light Railway. This line remained open to freight until 1981. In 1992, Sustrans converted a section of the trackbed between the village and York into part of the National Cycle Route 66. This section is included in the Way of the Roses cycle route, and was previously included in the White Rose cycle route.

== Facilities and landmarks ==
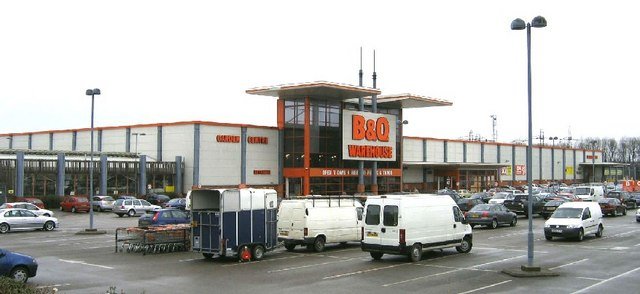
B&Q Superstore

There are shops at either end of the north portion of Thirkleby Way: convenience stores, hairdressers, eateries, et cetera. However, the village post office closed in July 2003. On Hull Road, there is a petrol station.

=== Pubs ===
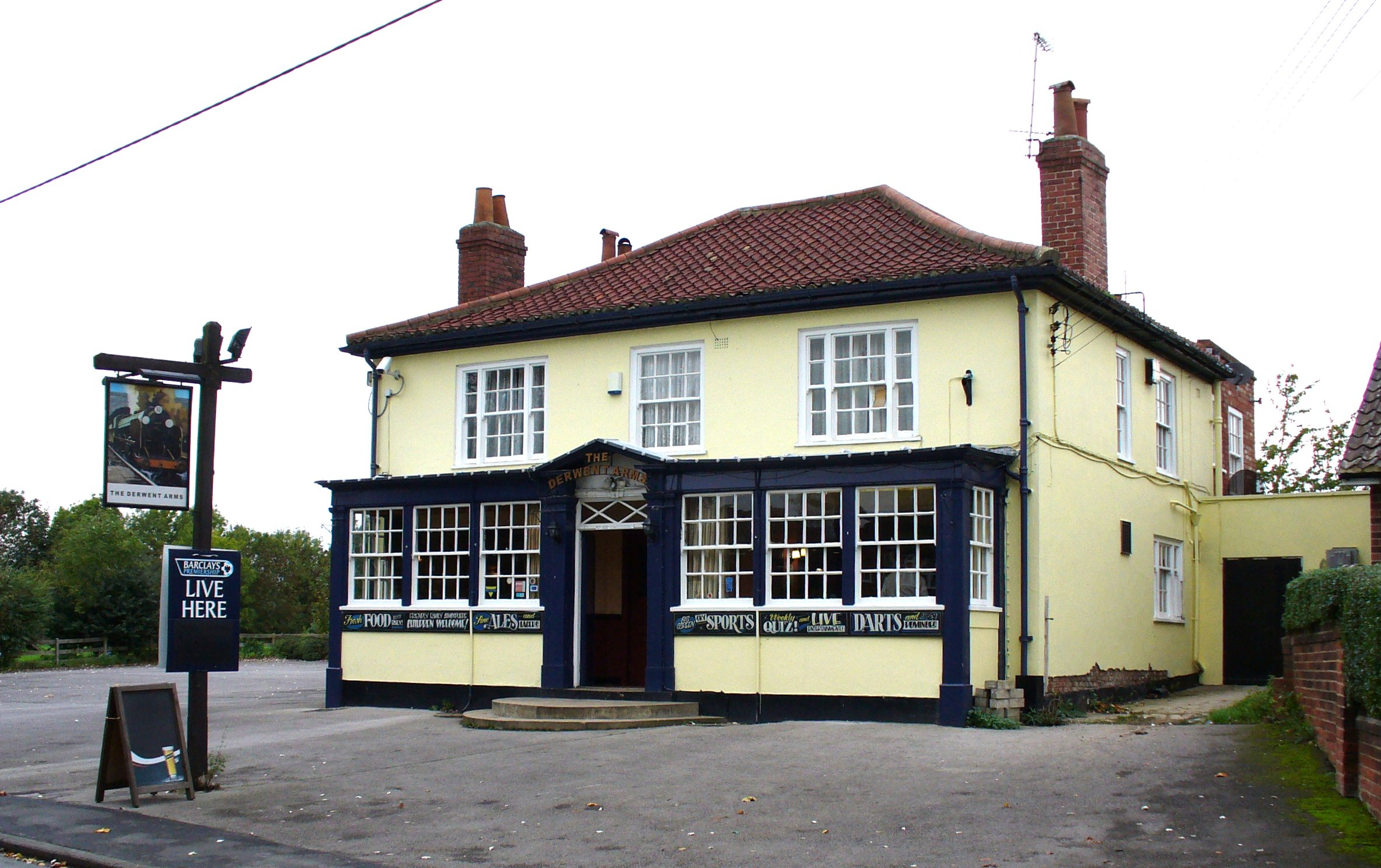
The Derwent Arms

The only remaining pub is The Derwent Arms. Situated on Osbaldwick Village, it was built in 1823. Known as The Black Bull until 1937, it consisted of the main pub house and a two-horse stable with a granary. To the right were two cow houses with a small orchard and pig pen behind. In front of this was another outbuilding. In the early years the pub had a wash house. Later, a long cattle shed for eight to nine cows was added onto the west side of the stable. It was later renamed The Derwent Arms after the Derwent Valley Light Railway. It currently consists of a rendered brick building with the public rooms on the ground floor and accommodation for the owners above. The pub has a large field which is used to host community events such as the village fair and a bonfire night.

A brewery-cum-taproom named The Handley Tap was opened in 2022 by Brew York.

Historically, another pub existed adjacent to St Thomas' Church. Established in 1831 by Thomas Cundall, it was named The Blacksmith's Arms in the mid-19th century and The Horse Shoe Inn in the early 20th. The Magnet was built in 1934 by John Smith's Brewery near recently-constructed houses on Osbaldwick Lane. It closed in 2018 and was demolished in 2023.

=== Education ===
Education in the village is provided by Osbaldwick Primary Academy, and most pupils transfer to Archbishop Holgate's School after Year 6. There is also a scout hut.

The earliest record of a village school dates from 1728, when Mary Thistlethwaite of Broad Oak, Murton donated £2 per year so that local poor children might be taught reading, writing and accountancy. It is thought that Thistlethwaite's beneficiaries attended a pre-existing school. By 1851, school was held in a parish-owend building near the churchyard and smithy. Around two-thirds of scholars were fee-paying. In 1876, due to increasing numbers, the school relocated to a new building on Murton Way (which, as of 2026, is Tiddlywinks' Nursery). By now, woodwork, needlework, art, scripture, and arithmetic were taught too, and nature walks to Murton were conducted. The old methodist chapel was co-opted for educating child evacuees in the Second World War.

The Murton Way school closed in 1962. It had three replacements. The Derwent County Primary had opened on Osbaldwick Lane in 1938. The Osbaldwick County Primary was to be built on Moat Field, but after a legal battle with housebuilders that had bought the site, it opened on The Leyes in 1963. The Derwent County Secondary opened in c.1958 off Carlton Avenue. The first two of the above three sites now house Osbaldwick Primary Academy. The third had been replaced with housing by 1988.

=== Listed buildings and former asylums ===
The village is home to four listed buildings, all of which are Grade II-listed. One is St Thomas' Church. The other three are 18th century private houses (the oldest in the village): Osbaldwick Hall, Hollytree House, and Stanley House. All three were private lunatic asylums in the 19th century.

Hollytree House was previously the Fern Hall Asylum for men. York apothecary Preston Hornby opened it in October 1814. Ownership passed to Holman Shepherd in 1828, and to the osteologist Thomas Allis in 1842. Allis' daughter and son-in-law took charge of the facility in 1853; the latter was the early photographer William Pumphrey. The premises' lease expired in 1860, whereupon operations moved to Lawrence Street, York.

Between 1821 and 1877, Stanley House was Terrace House, a private asylum for women. The abutting (non-listed) Derwent House housed the asylum's staff. Osbaldwick Hall was only briefly an asylum: from 1882 to 1887.

== Religion ==
The Church of England parish church dedicated to St Thomas dates from the 12th century. Windows in the north wall date from the 12th, 13th and 14th centuries. The church has been reordered and extended on a number of occasions, notably in 1877 by John Oldrid Scott and by later architects in both 1967 and 2005. A window in the church is a memorial to former Sheriff and Lord Mayor of York, James Barber. The church distributes a newsletter called the Parish Link.

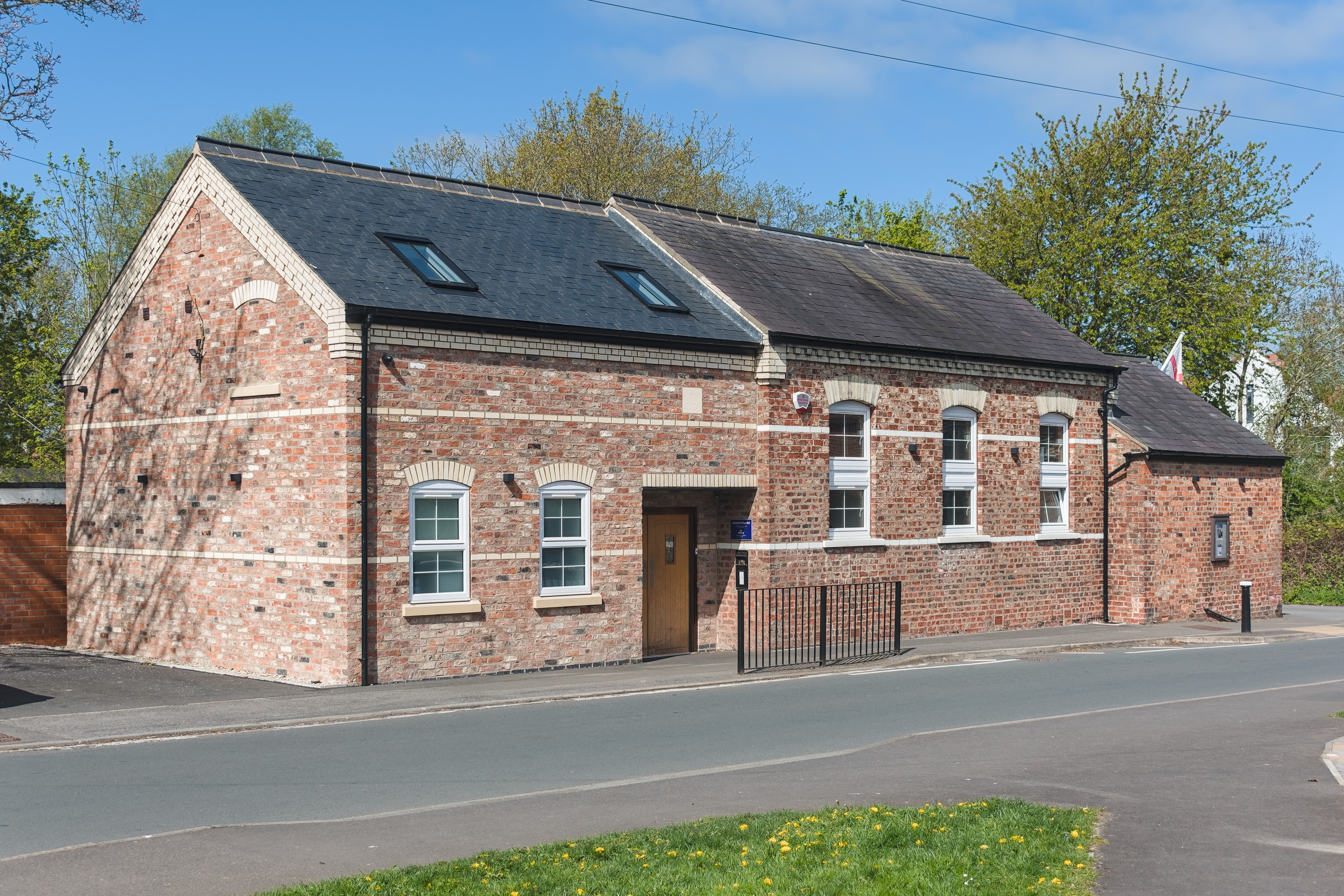
Former methodist chapel and village hall. The building's left half is an extension built in 2023.

In 1813, a Methodist society was founded. It eventually grew large enough to warrant its own building. This became possible after an 1871 donation of Thomas Allis; a Wesleyan chapel was erected next to Moat Field. Additions included an organ in 1899, and a schoolroom in 1918. These facilitated a sunday school and choir. The success of the Sunday school began to strain the relationship between the denominations, which had previously been cordial. Methodist worship ceased at the chapel in 1937, and in 1938 the building became a church hall for St Thomas'. Since 1969, the building has been used for secular purposes, initially as a village hall, and latterly as an events venue and nursery.

Following a 1905 fundraiser, the original "parish hall" was a converted North Eastern Railway carriage situated in the vicarage's garden (now the street Vicarage Gardens). Despite a village concert, a sale, sewing meetings, and "Japanese entertainment", insufficient funds were raised for a permanent building. The way the money had been spent caused much disquiet; the villagers had been expecting a non-denominational actual building. A row broke out at a parish meeting, which the police attended.

Regarding other religions, Quakers and Catholics were present in 1743. As of the 2020s, Christians make up only half the villagers, with irreligiosity and non-Christian religions contributing the remaining 46 and 4 percent, respectively.

== Sport and culture ==
Osbaldwick Sports Club on The Leyes plays host to football and cricket.

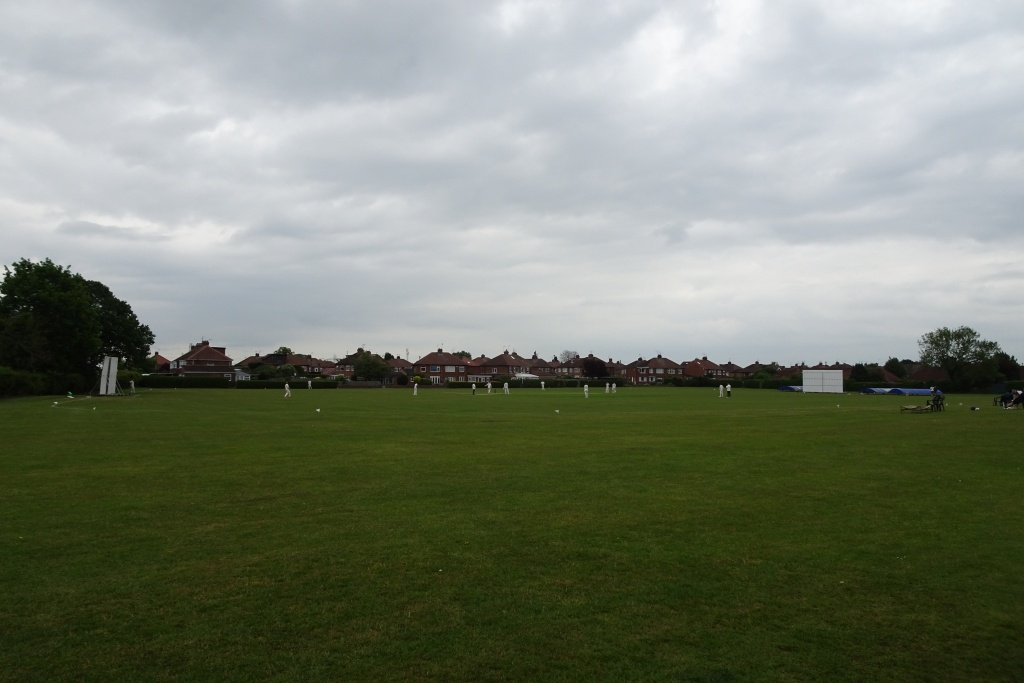
A cricket match at Osbaldwick

The football club plays in the York Football League, and was founded in the mid-1970s. They wear black and white striped kits. As of 2026, they are in its premier division, (at the eleventh tier of English football). They have won the premier division eleven times. Ten of these were consecutive, a feat aided by manager John Bell and professional players including Jimmy Crangle and John Harrison. There are also junior and reserve teams, the former having been previously coached by Crangle.

The cricket club was founded in c. 1880. As of 2026, it has three senior teams, which play in the Yorkshire Premier League North. There is also a social team, the Osbaldwick Ocelots, and juniors' teams (since 1976).

Stag hunts and fox hunts took place in the area in 19th and 20th centuries, respectively. Frequent whippet racing is recorded in the 1930s, and dog racing in the 1940s. A proposal to build a stadium in the village centre was submitted in 1945. It would have held athletics and greyhound and pony racing, and had a capacity of 15,000. The residents had been protesting against the disturbance caused by the racing since 1931. Determined opposition thus saw that the stadium never materialised.

In the early twentieth century, schoolchildren would dance on the green on May Day. Similarly, Empire Day was celebrated with flag drills.

== Appearance in media ==
A semi-fictionalised Osbaldwick features in the Peter Turnbull crime novel Chelsea Smile, and is mentioned in other books in the Hennessey and Yellich series by the same author. The village is also referred to in the novels Walking With Ghosts (John Baker), Jorvik (Sheelagh Kelly), The Abyss (Cynthia Harrod-Eagles) and Marrying the Mistress (Juliet Landon).

== Notable people ==
St Thomas's churchyard is the burial place of the Roman Catholic nun Mary Ward, who founded the Institute of the Blessed Virgin Mary (also known as the Sisters of Loreto). Her followers chose the location as they feared persecution were she to be buried somewhere more conspicuous. (Even burial at Osbaldwick was illegal). There is a tradition in the Institute that Ward's grave was once found to be empty. Some sources postulate that her body was moved to Europe by her followers, or by a foe in the Cromwellian period. However, skeletal remains thought to be hers were uncovered in a 1965 excavation. Dorothy Paston Bedingfield, a superior of the Institute, is buried in the same yard.

Two partners of the celebrated English landowner and diarist Anne Lister have connections to the village. Ann Walker, long-term partner of Lister, stayed at Terrace House between September 1843 and April 1844. Whilst there she was found to be "of unsound mind". Eliza Raine (born 1791), Lister's first love, spent seven years in the same facility. On 10 November 1853, she was moved there from an asylum in Clifton. Having died alone on new year's eve, 1860 whilst still at the asylum, she was buried in St Thomas' churchyard.

The churchyard has a second LGBT-related grave: that of William Hutchinson and his partner. Hutchinson was an 18th-century benefactor of Osbaldwick. Other benefactors include John and Elizabeth Rawson, Isabel Spenceley of Moreland Close, and John Straker.

Famous prebendaries of Osbaldwick include Thomas of Corbridge (1277–1280), Gilbert Welton (1352), Robert Hallam (1399–1400), John Catterick (1407), Robert Gilbert (1426), Edward Foxe (1527), Nicholas Wotton (1545–6), William Blethyn (July 1567), Matthew Hutton (August 1567), John Favour (1614-1616/7), William Crashaw (1617–1618), Darley Waddilove (1782–1783), George Pellew (1824–1828), John Jenkins (1828), Alfred Pearson (1903–1905) and Paul Burbridge (1966). Among the former parish vicars are the scholar Charles John Fynes Clinton (1824–1827) and the geneaologist William Ball Wright (1903–1912). Ball Wright was one of the first SPG Anglican missionaries to Japan.

Other notable residents include the lepidopterist Thomas Henry Allis, the suffrage campaigner Marion Coates Hansen the author Noel Botham, the academic Susan Mendus, and The Seahorses frontman Chris Helme. The 1994-5 lord mayor of York David Wilde is the only author of a publication dedicated to the village.
