= Derwenthorpe =

Suburb of the City of York, England

Coordinates: 53.959906°N 1.038749°W

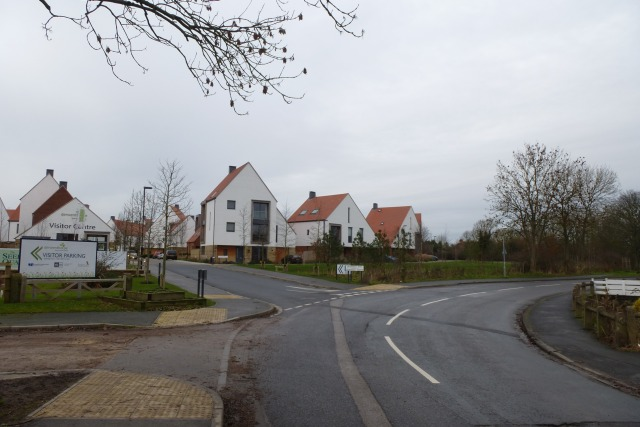
- Houses on Derwent Way

- Location within North Yorkshire
- Civil parish: Osbaldwick
- Unitary authority: City of York
- Ceremonial county: North Yorkshire
- Region: Yorkshire and the Humber
- Country: England
- Sovereign state: United Kingdom
- Post town: York
- Postcode district: YO10
- Police: North Yorkshire
- Fire: North Yorkshire
- Ambulance: Yorkshire
- UK Parliament: York Outer

Derwenthorpe (/ˈdɜːrwɛntθɔːp/ DER-went-thorp) is a housing development situated approximately 2 miles (3.2 km) to the east of York city centre which is adjacent to Osbaldwick, Tang Hall and Meadlands. The design and planning for this new estate was undertaken by the Joseph Rowntree Housing Trust (JRHT) and the building contract for all four build phases has been awarded to Barratt Developments (under the brand name "David Wilson Homes").

The original name of "New Osbaldwick" was dropped in favour of "Derwenthorpe" in 2004 in reference to the Derwent Valley Light Railway that used to run through the site.

== Environmental aims ==
All homes built will meet or exceed the Code for Sustainable Homes level 4 standard and include features such as MVHR in order to reduce energy consumption. Hot water and central heating is provided by means of a district heating biomass furnace system which is housed in the "Super Sustainable Centre" in the middle of the site.

== Awards ==
The development has won a number of awards for both design and build, including:

- Civic Trust Award, 2014 for Phase 1
- Housing Design Award, 2013 (completed category)
- What House? Awards, 2013. Silver awarded in the "Best Development" category
- Royal Institute for British Architects (RIBA) Yorkshire Award for sustainability, 2017 for Phase 1
- Royal Institute for British Architects (RIBA) Yorkshire Award for Best Large Residential Development, 2017 for Phase 2

== Controversy ==
A number of objections to the development were raised based on environmental and wildlife concerns. However most of these concerns were determined to be unfounded in an expert report which was commissioned by JRHT. Local residents submitted a petition in opposition to the development and, as a result, a public inquiry was conducted. Ultimately, the development was referred to the Communities and Local Government department for approval but the development was given the go-ahead in May 2007. Work on the first phase and infrastructure began in late 2010.

== Transport ==
Between 1913 and 1926 Osbaldwick was served by a station on the Derwent Valley Light Railway. This line remained open to freight until 1981 but has now been completely dismantled. Sustrans National Cycle Route 66 now runs on the former track bed which bisects the Derwenthorpe site.

The site is currently served by the Number 6 bus service which runs between the University of York and Clifton Moor but there are plans to create a new route featuring new zero-emission electric buses in future.

The number 25 by Transdev runs directly onto the estate. This runs from Derwenthorpe to Fulford under the York & Country branding.
