= Hull Road Park =

Park in York, England

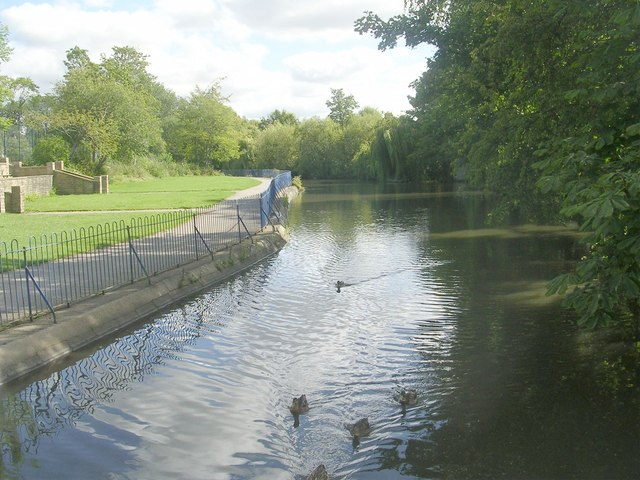
- Osbaldwick Beck, Hull Road Park
- Interactive map of Hull Road Park
- Location: Tang Hall, York, England
- OS grid: SE622515
- Coordinates: 53.955°N 1.056°W
- Area: 25 acres (10 ha)
- Created: 1927
- Water: Osbaldwick Beck
- Public transit: Alcuin Avenue bus stop

Hull Road Park is a 25-acre (10 ha) open-space park in the suburb of Tang Hall, York, in Northern England. The park is bordered on its southern edge by Osbaldwick Beck, which has become a home for the endangered water vole. The City of York Council withdrew support for the park in 2011, and it is maintained and cleaned by a network of volunteers working for several different societies.

== History ==
The park was opened in 1927 in the Tang Hall area of York, and is bordered by housing to the north, Tang Hall Lane to the east, Melrosegate to the west, and Osbaldwick Beck to the south. The beck, which flows from east to west (and feeds into the River Foss) has been canalised during the park's history and has several weirs.

After a seven-year remedial work programme on Osbaldwick Beck and its banks, it was confirmed in August 2024 that the red-list endangered water vole, had taken up residence on the beck through the park. Students from University of York helped in this effort by creating a bog garden along the banks of the beck in 2023. The course of the beck is prone to floods, which can overwhelm the roads on the western side of the park. In 2017, the city council provided £60,000 for a re-naturalisation scheme to help alleviate flooding. The area has been affected by flooding from Osbaldwick Beck and Tang hall Beck in 1947, 1982, 2000 and the Boxing Day floods of 2015.

Budgetary restraints in 2011 led to the City of York Council withdrawing attendants from the park, and flowerbeds being converted to public open spaces in an effort to save money. Several local volunteer groups now maintain parts of the park with access to council funding.

== Facilities and transport ==
The park covers an area of 25 acres (10 ha) and has basketball courts, tennis courts, a playpark, and large areas of semi-natural woodland. The park also used to have formal gardens and a bowling green, with a resident bowling team.

The No. 6 bus between Clifton Moor and Heslington calls at a stop opposite the park every twenty minutes during the day.
