= Martin Harwit =

Czech-American astronomer

- Born: Martin Otto Harwit; 9 March 1931 (age 95); Prague, Czechoslovakia
- Education: Massachusetts Institute of Technology; University of Michigan; Oberlin College
- Awards: Bruce Medal (2007)
- Scientific career
- Thesis: Measurement of Fluctuations in Radiation from a Source in Thermal Equilibrium (1960)
- Doctoral advisor: William Allis

Martin Otto Harwit (born 9 March 1931) is a Czech-American astronomer and author known for his scientific work on infrared astronomy as a professor at Cornell University. He was later director of the National Air and Space Museum in Washington, D.C. from 1987 to 1995.

== Career ==
He attended Oberlin College for his B.A. in physics, and earned a master’s degree from the University of Michigan, after which he was awarded a Ph.D in physics by Massachusetts Institute of Technology in 1960. That same year he was granted a NATO postdoctoral fellowship at Cambridge University, followed in 1961 by a (US) National Science Foundation postdoctoral fellowship at Cornell University, Ithaca, New York.

In 1962 he joined the astronomy faculty at Cornell and was later appointed professor. He designed, built and launched the first rocket-powered liquid-helium-cooled telescopes in the late 1960s and also carried out astronomical observations from high-altitude NASA aircraft. In 1987 he was elected a Fellow of the American Physical Society "in recognition of twenty-five years of outstanding contributions to theoretical and observational infrared astrophysics and for providing the leadership needed to create a coordinated space astrophysics program for the remainder of the century through the Great Observatory Program".

In 1987, he moved from Cornell to be director of the National Air and Space Museum in Washington, DC, where he organised the production of three wide-screen IMAX films, Blue Planet (1990), dealing with Earth, Destiny in Space, dealing with space exploration, and Cosmic Voyage, dealing with cosmic space and time. The latter film, released in 1996, was nominated for a 1997 Academy Award for best documentary.

== Enola Gay controversy ==
The museum was also involved in the restoration of historic aircraft, including the "Enola Gay", which had dropped an atomic bomb in 1945 on the Japanese city of Hiroshima. In 1994 Harwit became embroiled in public debate when his preparations for an Enola Gay exhibition to mark the 50th anniversary of the event were accused of being "revisionist history" for including Japanese accounts of the attack and photographs of the victims. His critics alleged that the exhibition commentary "depicted the Japanese as victims of a United States motivated by vengeance".

Two of the lines about the war in the Pacific became infamous:

For most Americans this war was fundamentally different than the one waged against Germany and Italy—it was a war of vengeance. For most Japanese, it was a war to defend their unique culture against Western imperialism.

The immediately preceding two sentences did acknowledge that

in December 1941, Japan attacked US bases at Pearl Harbor, Hawaii, and launched other surprise assaults against Allied territories in the Pacific. Thus began a wider conflict marked by extreme bitterness.

Those lines, in turn, were immediately preceded by

Japanese expansionism was marked by naked aggression and extreme brutality. The slaughter of tens of thousands of Chinese in Nanking in 1937 shocked the world. Atrocities by Japanese troops included brutal mistreatment of civilians, forced laborers and prisoners of war, and biological experiments on human victims.

The controversy led Harwit to resign as director of the National Air and Space Museum in May 1995.

== Honors ==
- 1987: Fellowship of American Physical Society
- Asteroid 12143 Harwit named after him.

== Works ==
- In Search of the True Universe. Cambridge University Press. 2013. ISBN 978-1-107-04406-7.
- Astrophysical Concepts (1st edition 1973, 4th edition 2006) ISBN 978-0-387-32943-7; Harwit, Martin (2013). pbk reprint of 2nd edition. Springer. ISBN 9781475720198.
- Cosmic Discovery: The Search, Scope and Heritage of Astronomy (1981) ISBN 978-0-7108-0089-3
  - Cosmic Discovery: The Search, Scope, and Heritage of Astronomy. Cambridge University Press. 21 March 2019. ISBN 978-1-108-72204-9; revised issue
- An Exhibit Denied: Lobbying the History of Enola Gay (1996) ISBN 978-0-387-94797-6
