= William Patten (zoologist) =

American zoologist

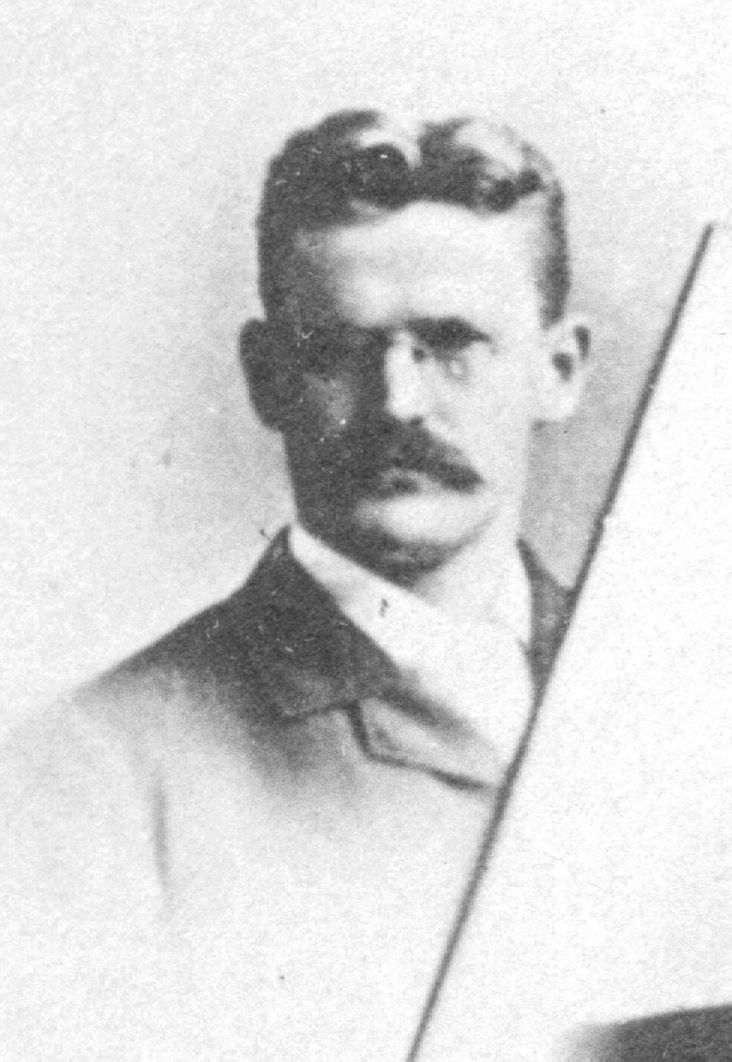
- William Patten
- Born: March 15, 1861; Watertown, Massachusetts
- Died: October 27, 1932 (aged 71); Hanover, New Hampshire
- Education: Harvard University; Leipzig University
- Known for: ideas about evolution; ostracoderms
- Spouse: Elizabeth Merrill
- Children: 1
- Scientific career
- Workplaces: Lake Laboratory; University of North Dakota; Dartmouth College
- Thesis: (1884)
- Author abbrev. (zoology): Patten

William Patten (1861-1932) was an American biologist and zoologist at University of North Dakota and Dartmouth College noted for work on fossil ostracoderms, ideas on the origin of vertebrates from arachnids and his 1919 address to the American Association for the Advancement of Science and follow-up book about The Grand Strategy of Evolution: the Social Philosophy of a Biologist.

== Early life and education ==
William Patten was born in Watertown, Massachusetts on March 15, 1861. He attended Harvard university (then known as the Lawrence Scientific School) and was awarded the Walker prize of the Boston Society of Natural History during his first year for an essay about Myology and osteology of the cat. He graduated with a B.Sc. degree in 1883 and was awarded a Parker Travelling Fellowship. He then travelled to Europe and studied with Rudolph Leuckart at Leipzig University in Germany. Leuckart specialised in parasitology as well as having some interest in insects, taking a morphological approach to both. Patten studied marine invertebrates with Leuckart's group, developing a life-long interest in embryology and evolutionary relationships. His work was supported by a fellowship from Harvard for three year's research in Europe. He was awarded a doctoral degree in 1884. He then spent a year at the Zoological Station at Trieste and another at the Naples Zoological Station.

Patten returned to the USA and between 1886 and 1889 acted as a research assistant at the Lake Laboratory in Milwaukee, Wisconsin, the private research laboratory of Edward Allis. While he was there, he hypothesised that vertebrates were derived from arachnid ancestors, and the exploration of this idea was important in his future research. Among others at the laboratory was William Morton Wheeler and Patten influenced him to study insect embryology and development using the cockroach as an example, which became an important part of his future career.

In October 1889 Patten was appointed the Professor of Biology and Curator of Museums at the University of North Dakota. His research focused on the origin of vertebrates, considering that arthropods were more likely ancestors rather than the then-current idea of annelid worms. This led him to research the ostracoderms, extinct armored jawless fish, to support evolution from arthropods to them and then to vertebrates. He also conducted other fieldwork. For example, in summer 1890 he was commissioned by the Botanical Division of the United States Department of Agriculture to collect specimens of grass from North Dakota for a project to determine if any were suitable for growing for grazing without irrigation. This assessment was undertaken by staff at the newly-established North Dakota Agricultural College in Fargo. He also gave talks to local societies, including on the subject of evolution.

In 1893 he was appointed as a professor at the private Dartmouth College in New Hampshire, USA. The University of North Dakota appointed Melvin A. Brannon to replace him. Patten continued to work on the phylogeny of ostracoderms, scorpions and primitive fish as well some a minor interests such as the embryology of molluscs and arthropods. He travelled worldwide during summer vacations to collect fossils, including to Australia, Japan, Costa Rica, Cuba, Labrador and the Baltic region. He became very skilled in revealing the fossilised remains from its stony matrix to see previously unknown fine structural details. His research supported his belief that ostracoderms were the ancestors of fish and linked invertebrates to vertebrates. Patten tended to work alone and rarely attended scientific conferences. He was a forceful lecturer.

Between 1920 and his retirement in 1931 he gave a lecture course on evolution to all new students at Dartmouth College. The content was probably a development of his course in Comparative Anatomy of Vertebrates that he started in 1898. This became a course where he and other members of the academic staff linked science, including evolution of humans and Darwin's theory, to other disciplines. It was a mandatory course for all new students which was both innovative and quite controversial. At the time, some states in the USA did not allow evolution to be covered in children's education. In 1919 he addressed the annual meeting of American Association for the Advancement of Science about “The Message of the Biologist” and followed this with a book The Grand Strategy of Evolution: the Social Philosophy of a Biologist He outlined a philosophy of science in service to society that invoked chemistry theory, mixed with evolution theory and ecology.

However, by 1923 there was little opposition to the course and it was seen as a leading example of pedagogy.

== Publications ==
Patten was the author of several books and many scientific publications. These included:

- William Patten (1885) The Embryology of Patella. Arbeiten aus dem Zoologischen Instituts zu Wein. Published Vienna.
- William Patten (1887) Eyes of molluscs and arthropods. Journal of Morphology 1 (1):67-92
- William Patten (1890) On the Origin of Vertebrates from Arachnids. Quarterly Journal of Microscopical Sciences. 31 (3):317-378.
- William Patten (1912) The evolution of the vertebrates and their kin. P. Blakiston's Son & Company.
- William Patten (1920 The message of the biologist. Science. 51 (1309) 93-102
- William Patten (1920) The Grand Strategy of Evolution: The Social Philosophy of a Biologist. RG Badger.
- William Patten (1931) New Ostracoderms from Oesel Science 73 (1901):671-673

He also described and named some fossil species. Dartmuthia, the type genus of the ostracoderm family Dartmuthiidae was named by him.

== Personal life ==
Patten married Elizabeth Merrill in 1883. She accompanied him on his fossil collecting expeditions. They had one child. Patten was noted for his singing in a local musical society while he was at University of North Dakota. He died in Hanover, New Hampshire on October 27, 1932.

== Awards and honors ==
He was a member of the Phi Beta Kappa society, recognising excellence in the sciences and liberal arts from a small number of universities in the USA. Patten was elected as a Fellow of the American Academy of Arts and Sciences in 1921. He was the chair and vice-president of the Zoology section of the American Association for the Advancement of Science in 1919. He was awarded an honorary Doctor of Science degree when he retired by Dartmouth College.

== Legacy ==
After his death in 1932, Patten's collection of ostracoderm fossils was donated to the American Museum of Natural History in New York. There were over 4,500 specimens.
