= St James' Church, Murton =

Grade II listed church in York, England

Coordinates: 53°57′56″N 1°00′45″W

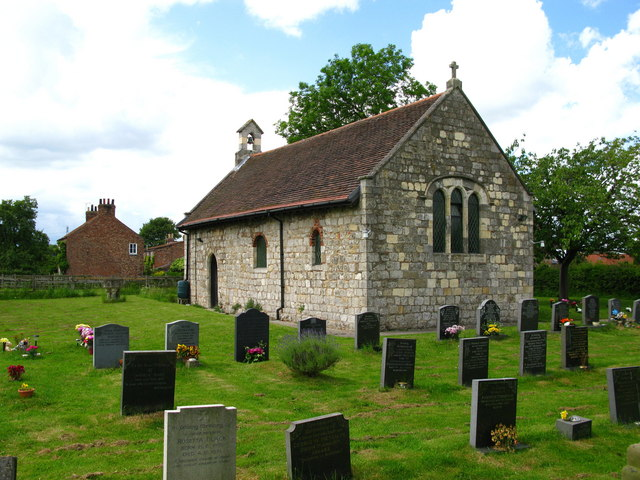
The church, in 2009

St James' Church is the parish church of Murton, a village immediately east of the built-up area of the City of York, in England.

The church was built in about 1200, as a simple rectangular structure of limestone. It served as a chapel-of-ease to St Thomas' Church, Osbaldwick. By the 19th century, it was unclear who was responsible for its upkeep. When the roof was badly damaged in a storm, in 1834, it was not repaired, and the chapel became a ruin. For a period, it served as a pig sty.

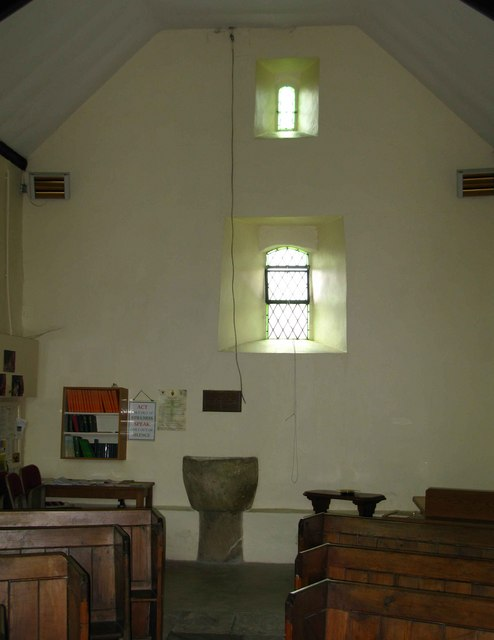
Interior of the church, in 2009, showing the font

By the early 20th century, the south and west walls remained at almost their full height, including the original south door, and two small windows which had been repaired in brick. In 1914, the chapel was restored, with the north and east walls rebuilt, with a new window each, a new tiled roof added, topped by a bellcote, and a lean-to hut added at the west end.

In about 1950, a new font was installed. It was found in the churchyard of St Thomas in Osbaldwick and believed to date from the 12th century. In 2016, a small brick-built extension was added, providing a welcome lobby, toilet, and kitchen.

The church was Grade II listed in 1953.
