= Journal of Morphology =

- Discipline: Anatomy, morphology
- Language: English
- Edited by: J. Matthias Starck

Publication details
- History: 1887–present
- Publisher: John Wiley & Sons
- Frequency: Monthly
- Impact factor: 1.804 (2020)

Standard abbreviations
- ISO 4: J. Morphol.

Indexing
- ISSN: 0362-2525 (print); 1097-4687 (web)

Links
- Journal homepage

The Journal of Morphology is a peer-reviewed scientific journal of anatomy and morphology featuring primary research articles, review articles, and meeting abstracts. The journal was established in 1887 by zoologists and morphologists Edward Phelps Allis and C. O. Whitman. The journal appeared regularly from 1887 onwards and made a financial loss. Allis provided the support necessary for the journal to continue appearing until, after a short gap, the journal underwent reorganization in 1907 when it was taken over by Wistar Institute in Philadelphia, as a more permanent solution to its financial problems. As of 2022, it is edited by J. Matthias Starck.

According to the Journal Citation Reports, the journal has a 2020 impact factor of 1.804, ranking it 12th out of 21 journals in the category "Anatomy & Morphology".
