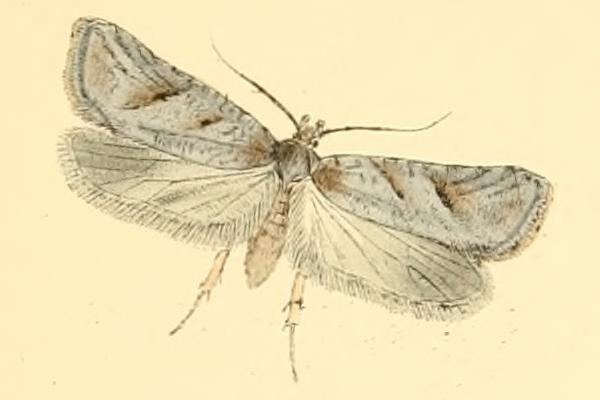

Scientific classification
- Kingdom: Animalia
- Phylum: Arthropoda
- Clade: Pancrustacea
- Class: Insecta
- Order: Lepidoptera
- Family: Depressariidae
- Genus: Exaeretia
- Species: E. allisella

Binomial name
- Exaeretia allisella Stainton, 1849

Synonyms
- Depressaria lechriosema Meyrick, 1928

= Exaeretia allisella =

Species of moth

Exaeretia allisella is a moth of the family Depressariidae. It is found in most of northern and central Europe, Siberia, the Russian Far East, Mongolia and northern and central China.

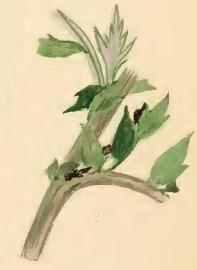
A sprig of Lithospermum officinale eaten by larva

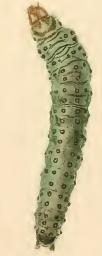
Larva

The wingspan is 20–23 mm. The forewings are reddish-grey, irregularly and suffusedly irrorated with whitish; a cloudy ferruginous fascia from middle of costa to tornus, marked with a dark fuscous spot in middle, and edged anteriorly with whitish suffusion. Hindwings pale yellowish-grey. The larva is greyish-green, dorsally reddish tinged; spots dark grey; head yellow-brown.

Adults are on wing from July to August.

The larvae feed on Artemisia vulgaris. They first feed in the rootstock, but later in the young stems.

The species is named after Thomas Henry Allis, who collected some of the original specimen and sent them to Stainton for his revision of the genus.
