= St Thomas' Church, Osbaldwick =

Listed church in York, England

Coordinates: 53°57′33″N 1°02′01″W

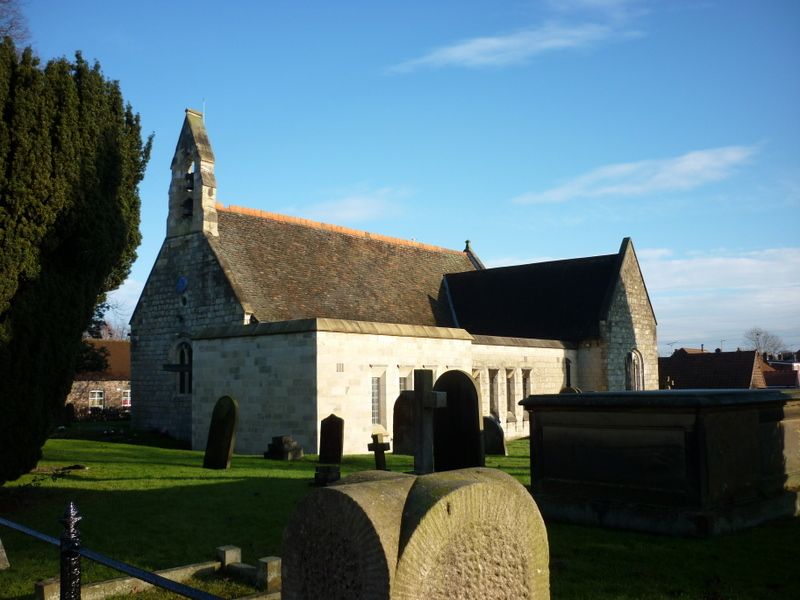
The church, in 2011

St Thomas' Church is the parish church in Osbaldwick, a suburban village to the east of York, in England.

The church was built of limestone in the 12th century. The nave, chancel, and several round-headed windows date from this period. The bowl of a 12th-century font also survives, although it is broken and no longer in use. A window on the south side of the chancel dates was added in about 1300. Around the nave, the lower part of the wall is panelled with some panelling dating from the 16th century, while the communion table and pulpit are Jacobean.

The church was heavily restored by John Oldrid Scott in 1877. In 1967, A. Michael Mennim added a south transept, a new south porch, a vestry and an organ chamber, giving the church an L-shaped plan. He moved the Perpendicular east window to the south end of the transept and made the east end a blank wall. He also relocated the 12th-century south door to the east side of the transept. In 2005, the church was reordered, with the addition of a kitchen and the replacement of the pews with chairs.

It used to have a chapel-of-ease in St James' Church, Murton.

Mary Ward, founder of the Congregation of Jesus, is buried in the churchyard. Her gravestone, now in the church's south wall, is inscribed: "To love the poore, persever in the same, live, dy and rise with them was all the ayme of Mary Ward who having lived 60 years and 8 days dyed the 20th of Jan 1641".

The church is part of the Diocese of York. It was Grade II listed in 1953.

== Windows ==
There are five stained glass windows in the church, of varying ages. The leading in the non-stained windows emphasises a triple cross motif.

Stained glass in St Thomas' church, clockwise from the entrance
On the west gable
Memorial to James and Margaret Barber

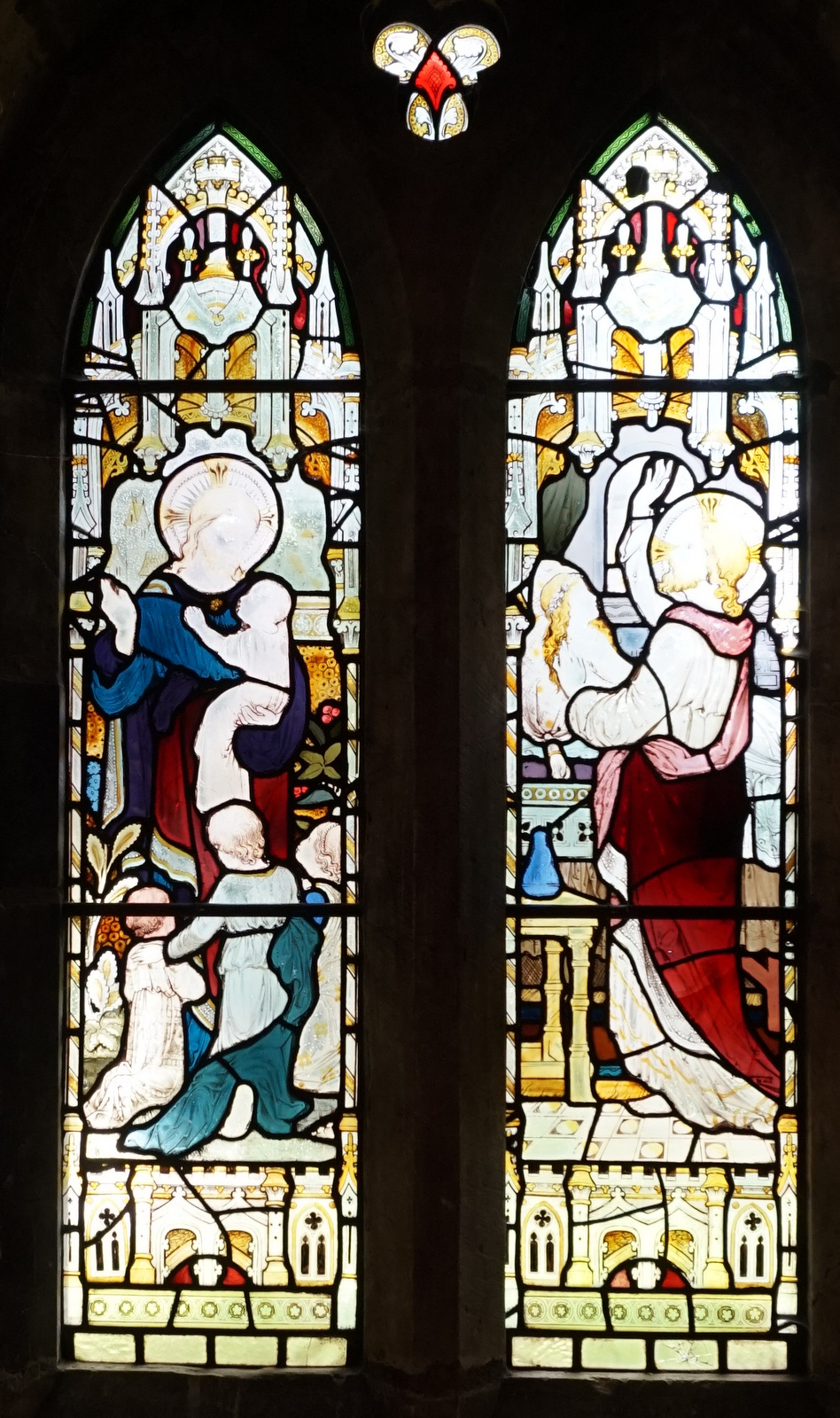
On the north wall
Christ blessing children and raising Jairus' daughter

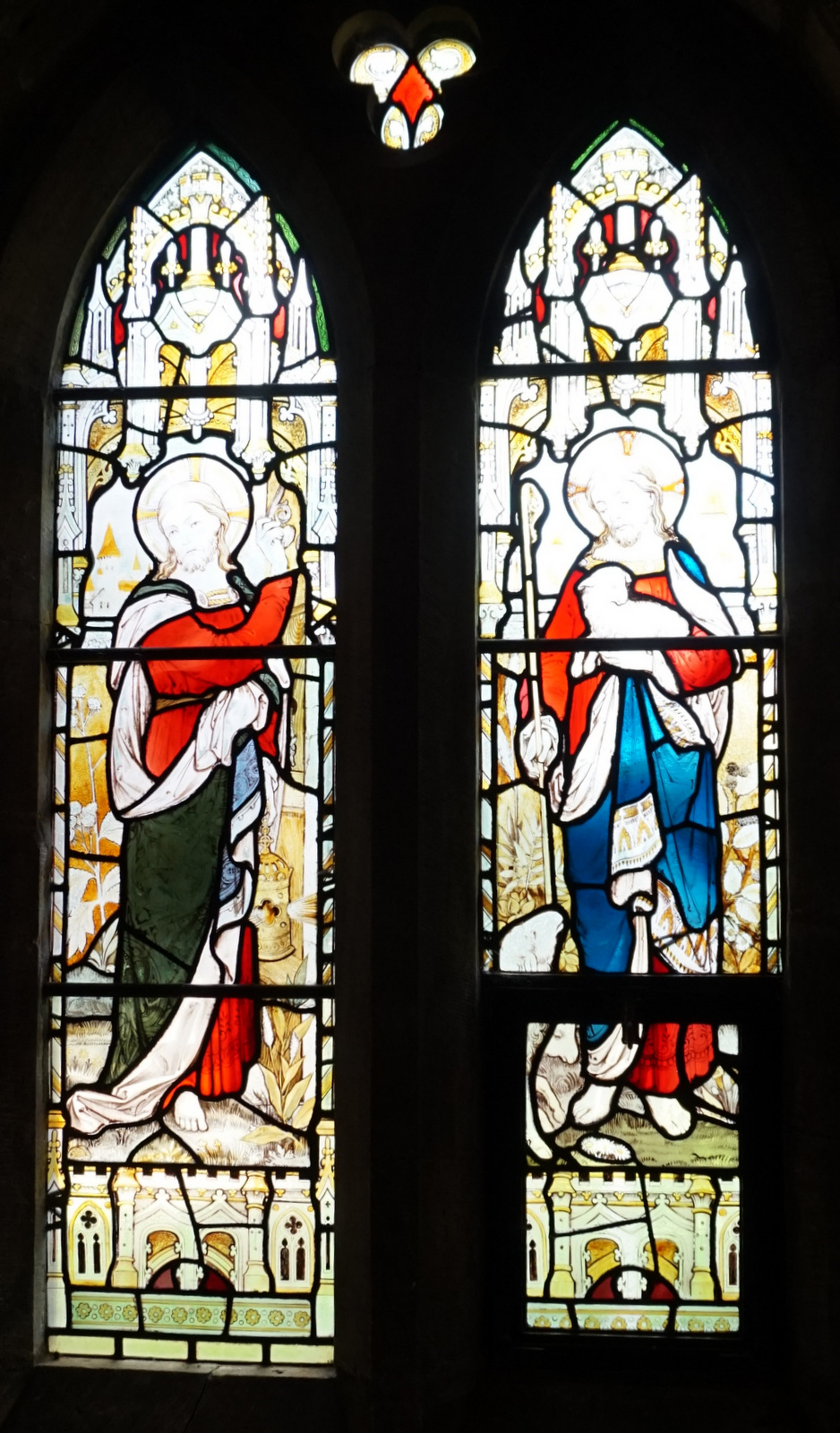
On the north wall
Christ as light of the world and the good shepherd

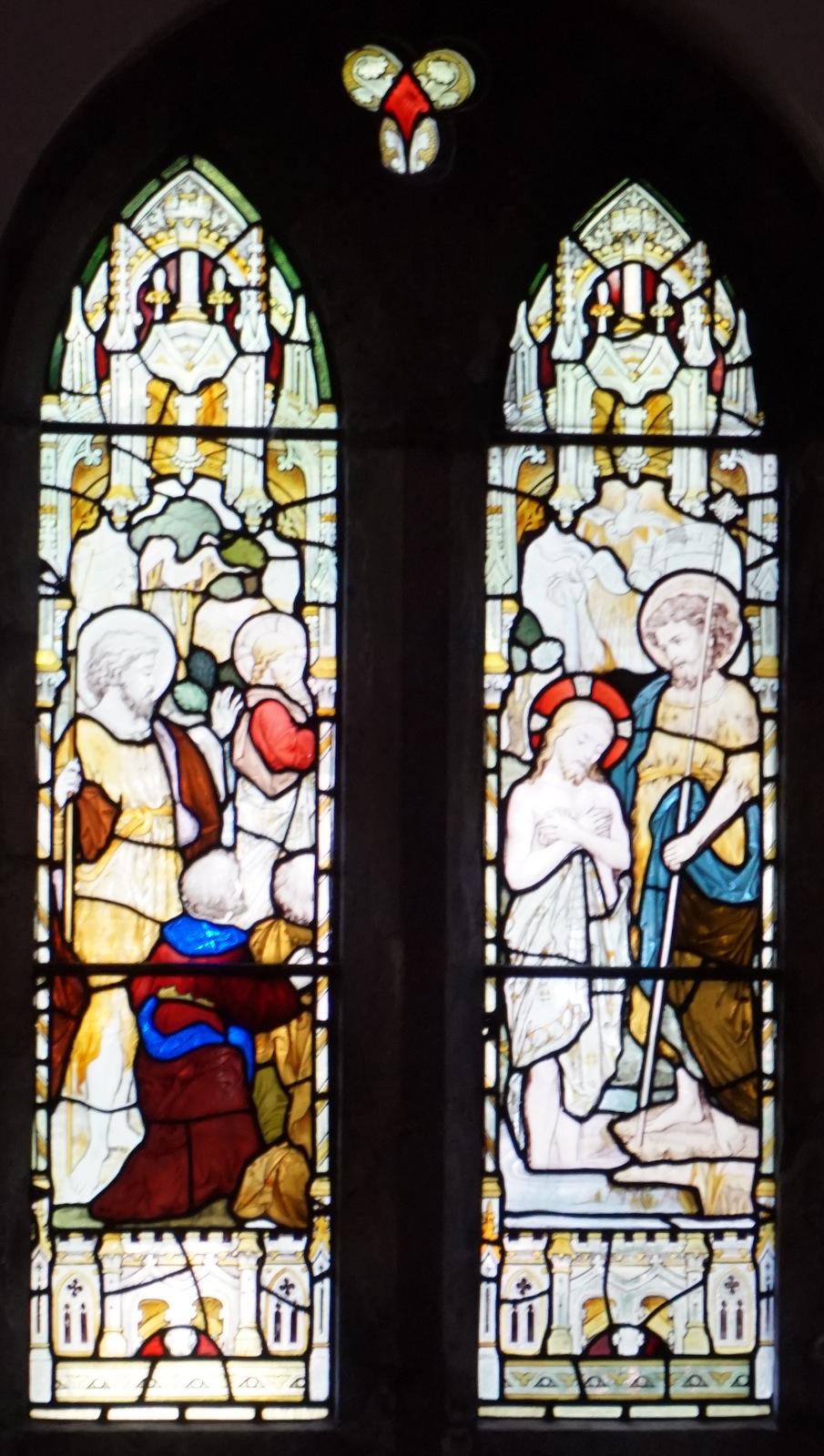
On the north wall
John the Baptist preaching and baptising Christ

On the south wall
Christ's crucifixion, resurrection and ascension
