= Tang Hall =

Area of York, North Yorkshire, England

Coordinates: 53.96203°N 1.05278°W

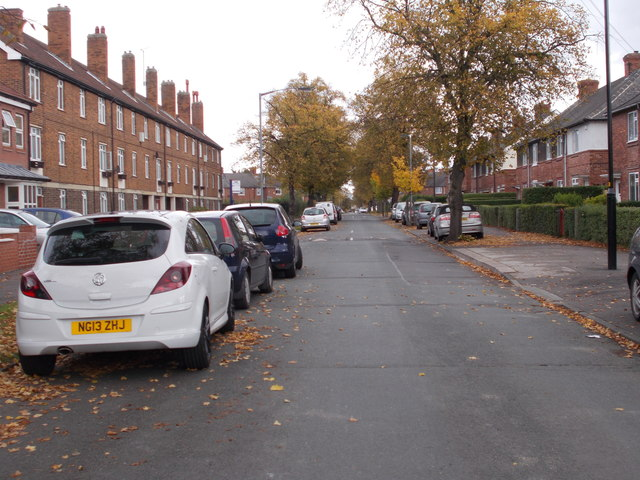
- Fourth Avenue

- Location within North Yorkshire
- OS grid reference: SE622521
- Unitary authority: City of York
- Ceremonial county: North Yorkshire
- Region: Yorkshire and the Humber
- Country: England
- Sovereign state: United Kingdom
- Post town: YORK
- Postcode district: YO10
- Police: North Yorkshire
- Fire: North Yorkshire
- Ambulance: Yorkshire
- UK Parliament: York Central

Tang Hall is a suburban district of the city of York in North Yorkshire, England. The name is derived from the Anglo Saxon Tang, which means the meeting place of two becks (Osbaldwick and Tang Hall becks join in the nearby St Nicholas Fields Local Nature Reserve, but this portion of the water courses is now culverted), and a Hall that stood on Fourth Avenue until the 1970s. The Hall was latterly used as the Tang Hall pub, and known at that time as the Tang Hall Hotel, until it was demolished and replaced by a purpose-built pub, the Tang Hall, which in turn was demolished in 2007.

== Overview ==
Tang Hall lies in the east of the city and is approximately bordered by Heworth to the north, Hull Road to the south, Melrosegate and Fifth Avenue to the west and Osbaldwick and Burnholme to the east. The area consists mainly of houses dating from the 1930s, most of which are council houses or ex-council houses. The area is popular for student housing because the University of York is nearby. Tang Hall is supplied by a local convenience store, various takeaways, a bakers, and a pharmacy. Tang Hall Community Centre, Tang Hall Surgery, Tang Hall Library and Tang Hall Primary School, established in the 1920s as Tang Hall School and the Avenue School, also serve the local community.

The area has three churches: St Hilda's Church, St George's Methodist Church and St Aelred's Roman Catholic Church. The current St Hilda's Church was built recently to replace the older, larger St Hilda's Church which was on the same site. Whilst it stood for many years, it remained unfinished until its demolition. St Aelred's Roman Catholic Church has a number of statues by Professor Julius Maugsch, a Hungarian sculptor from Budapest who settled in Penyghent Avenue after leaving Hungary in the 1960s. St Aelreds school, a Roman Catholic Primary school, occupied the site next to the church but has since been demolished. St Margaret Clitherow Secondary Modern School for Girls was at the junction of Penyghent Avenue and Fifth Avenue, but is now also demolished. A new St Aelreds school was built on the site of St Margeret Clitherow's and still stands today, attaining good league table scores every year.

Although Heworth Village and some of the streets around it retain a village feel, development since the late 19th century has linked Heworth to the city, and it is effectively one of the ring of suburbs surrounding York. The area ranges from streets of terraced houses near the city towards Layerthorpe via large Victorian "villas" on East Parade and Heworth Green to older houses along Heworth Village and 1930s semi-detached houses on Stockton Lane. Much modern suburban development has taken place, particularly in the outlying area of Heworth Without.

The portion of Monk Stray nearest Heworth is a popular open space, whilst Heworth Holme is an area of grassland adjacent to part of Tang Hall Beck. The area boasts one of the city's largest parks (Hull Road Park, sometimes known as Tang Hall Park) which follows the course of Osbaldwick Beck mainly between Tang Hall Lane and Melrosegate. St Nicholas Fields Local Nature Reserve is home to York's Environment Centre and offers its own composting and door to door recycling collection service.

The area is served by one secondary school, Archbishop Holgate's School, located in the Badger Hill area beyond Hull Road. It has since expanded with an English block called the Harris Building due to expansion in numbers as of the closure of Burnholme community college. This school was formerly Archbishop Holgate’s Grammar School for Boys, which was on this site from 1963.

On City of York Council, Tang Hall is mostly covered by the Hull Road and Heworth wards. The current councillors are Ben Burton (Labour Party), Bob Webb (Labour) and Claire Douglas (Labour) for Heworth Ward; and Anna Baxter (Labour), Sophie Kelly (Labour) and Michael Pavlovic (Labour) for Hull Road Ward.

== Gallery ==
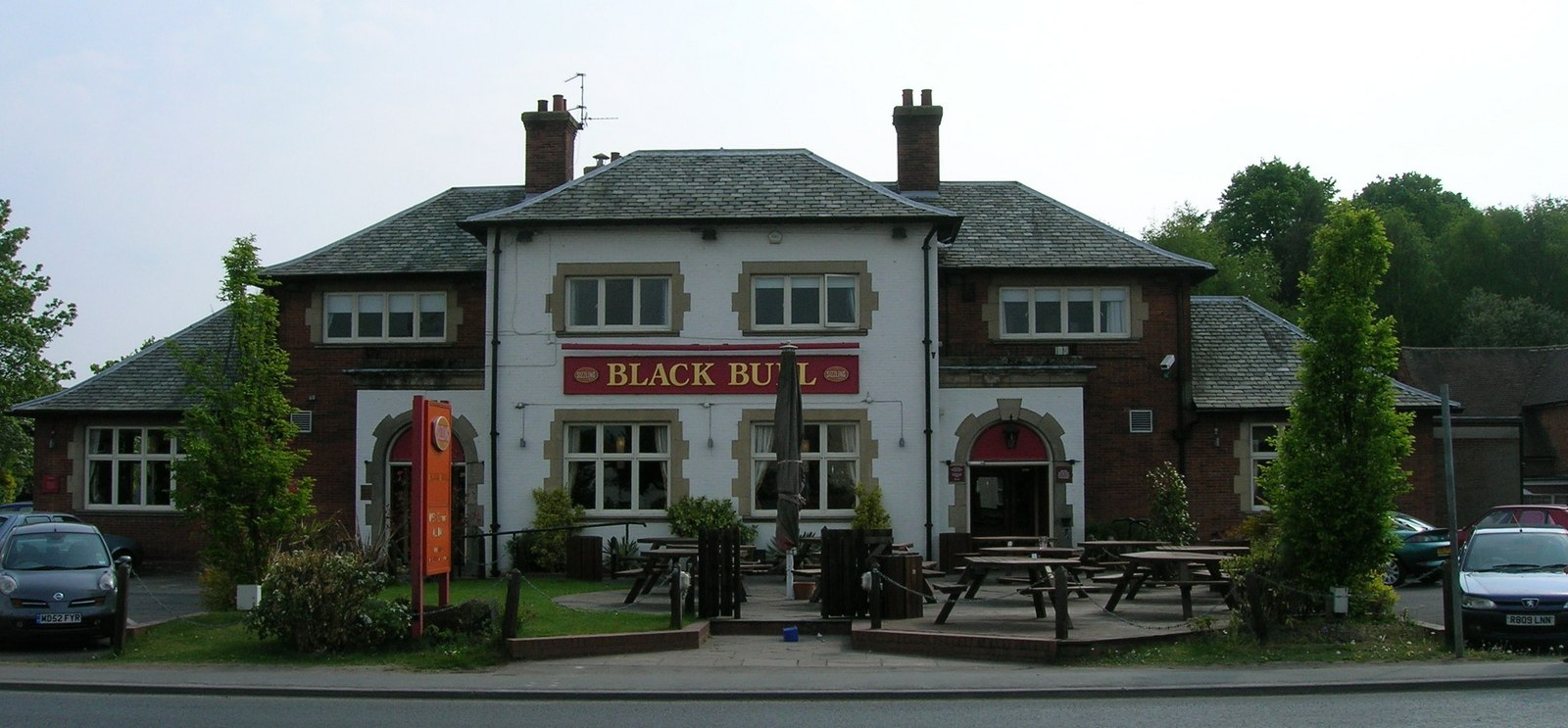
The Black Bull, Hull Road

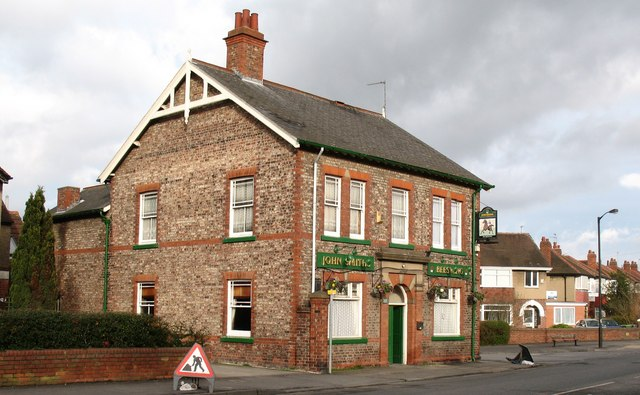
The Beeswing, Hull Road

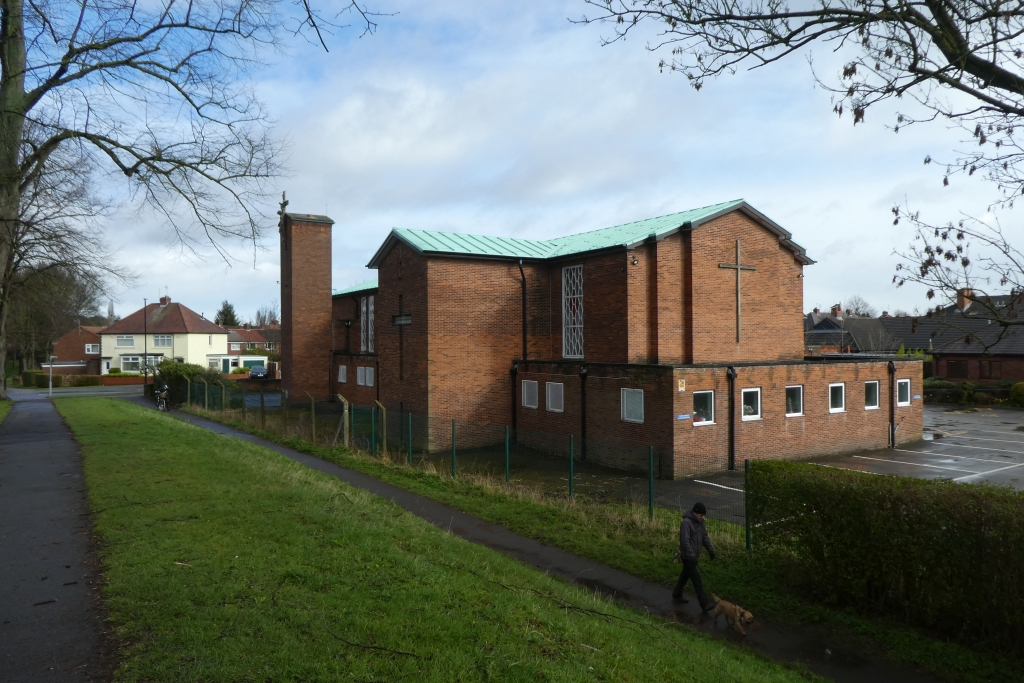
St Aelreds Church, Fifth Avenue

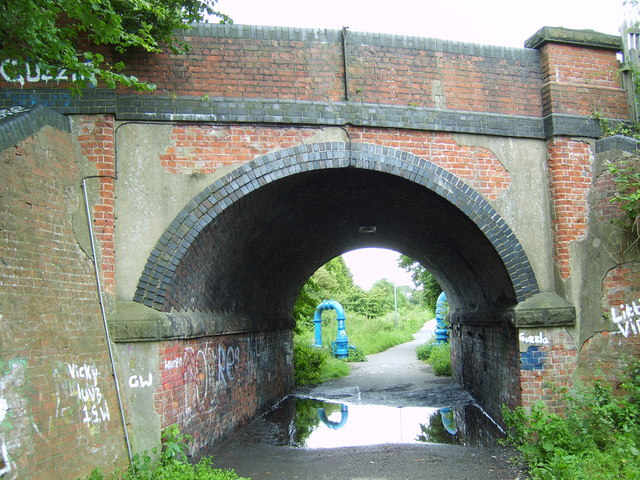
Tang Hall Bridge
