= Thomas Allis =

British osteologist and curator (1788–1875)

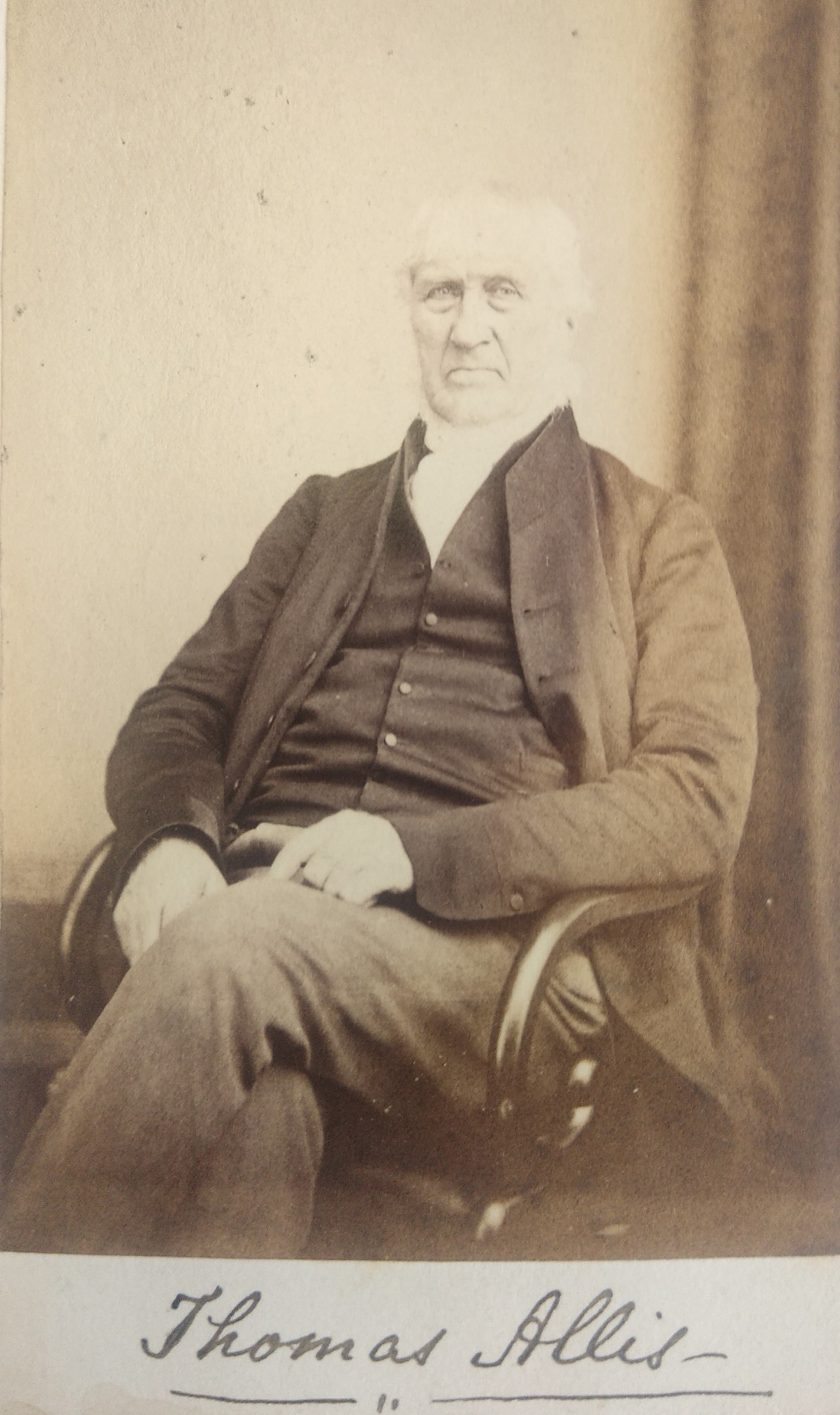
- Born: 9 January 1788; Tewkesbury
- Died: 24 September 1875 (aged 87); York
- Occupations: Museum curator Osteologist; Superintendent

Thomas Allis FLS (9 January 1788 – 24 September 1875) was a British osteologist and museum curator.

== Career ==
Allis was educated in Burford and married Mary Naish of Flax Bourton in 1812, before going to York in 1823. He was appointed Superintendent of The Retreat, a private asylum in York, a position he kept until 1842 when he left to work in a similar position in Osbaldwick. Alongside his profession he studied ornithology and osteology.

Allis held two Honorary Curatorships at the Yorkshire Museum from 1835 to 1875, was elected as a Fellow of the Linnean Society in 1857 and was one of the first members of the British Association. He was Honorary Curator of Ornithology from 1835 to 1839 before succeeding James Atkinson, following his death in 1839, in the post of Honorary Curator of Comparative Anatomy – a position Allis held from 1839 until his death in 1875.

Allis also served as vice-president of the Yorkshire Philosophical Society (YPS). In 1838, the YPS purchased a collection of comparative anatomy from Allis for £350.

== Personal life ==
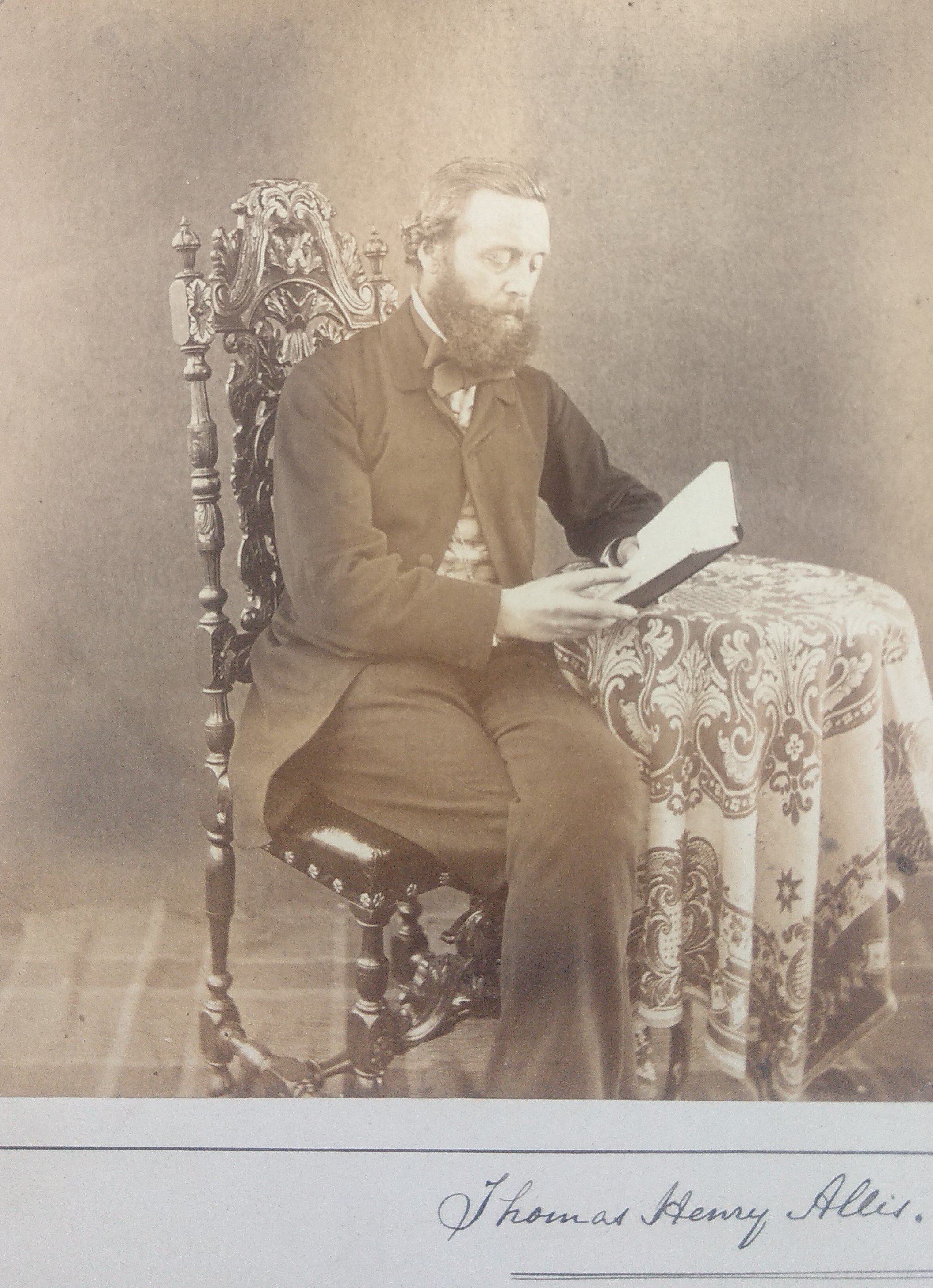
Thomas Henry Allis, lepidopterist, son of Thomas Allis

Allis was a quaker. He had a son, Thomas Henry Allis, who was described as "assiduous collector of Lepidoptera", The son died in August 1870, five years before Thomas Allis senior.

== Select publications ==
- Allis, T. 1832. 'On Certain peculiarities of the bony fabric of the Ostrich, Emu, and Swift, Annual Report of the Yorkshire Philosophical Society
- Allis, T. 1837. 'On the Sclerotic Bones forming the Orbit of the Eye in different Bird and Reptiles', Report of the British Association
- Allis, T. 1865. 'Further Note on a Skeleton of Dinornis robustus, Owen, in the York Museum', Journal of the Proceedings of the Linnean Society of London 8 (11–12), 140–141.
- Allis, T. 1873. 'On the Skeleton of the Apteryx', Zoological Journal of the Linnean Society 11 (56), 523.
