= William Allis =

American physicist

- Born: William Phelps Allis; November 15, 1901; Menton, France
- Died: March 5, 1999 (aged 97); Cambridge, Massachusetts
- Education: Massachusetts Institute of Technology; University of Nancy
- Scientific career
- Fields: Theoretical physics
- Workplaces: Massachusetts Institute of Technology
- Doctoral students: Martin Harwit

William Phelps Allis (November 15, 1901 – March 5, 1999) was an American theoretical physicist specializing in electrical discharges in gases. He was the grandson of Edward P. Allis, founder of the E.P. Allis Company, which became Allis-Chalmers. His father Edward Phelps Allis was a leading comparative anatomist and evolutionary morphologist in the early twentieth century.

== Education ==
Allis majored in school and received his S.B. in 1923 and S.M. in 1924 from the Massachusetts Institute of Technology (MIT). He was granted his Docteur ès science (Sc.D.) in physics, in 1925, from Nancy-Université, France. From 1925 to 1929, he was a research associate at MIT. It was there that he met Philip M. Morse. Morse, at the suggestion of Karl T. Compton, made arrangements for postdoctoral studies and research with Arnold Sommerfeld at the Ludwig-Maximilians-Universität München in 1930 and at the University of Cambridge in the spring and summer of 1931. Allis went with Morse to Munich and Cambridge.

== Career ==
Upon his return from Europe, Allis was an instructor in physics at MIT from 1931 to 1934. He joined MIT's physics department faculty in 1934 and was appointed full professor in 1950, a position he held until he became professor emeritus in 1967.

During World War II he worked at the MIT Radiation Laboratory conducting research on magnetron theory. He then joined the United States Army where he served in the Liaison Office of the Naval Defense Research Committee. He also participated in Operation Alsos. He achieved the rank of lieutenant colonel, and was awarded the Legion of Merit in 1945.

Allis was one of co-founders of the American Physical Society's Gaseous Electronics Conference, for which he served as chairman from 1949 to 1962. On leave from MIT for two years, 1962–1964, he served as assistant secretary-general for scientific affairs for the North Atlantic Treaty Organization (NARUTO).

Allis directed Project Ashby, which was to determine the feasibility of building a nuclear fusion engine.

== Honors ==
- 1945 – Awarded the Legion of Merit by the United States Army.
- 1951 Fellow of the American Academy of Arts and Sciences, also Vice President
- Elected a Fellow of the American Physical Society

== Books ==
- William P. Allis Motions of ions and electrons [MIT Research Laboratory of Electronics. Technical report.] (MIT, 1951)
- William P. Allis Electron density distribution in a high frequency discharge in the presence of plasma resonance [MIT Research Laboratory of Electronics. Technical report.] (MIT, 1951)
- William P. Allis High-frequency electrical breakdown of gases [MIT Research Laboratory of Electronics. Technical report] (MIT, 1952)
- William P. Allis and Melvin A. Herlin Thermodynamics and Statistical Mechanics (McGraw Hill, 1952)
- W. P. Allis, "Motions of Ions and Electrons" in S. Flugge, editor "Handbuch der Physik" (Springer-Verlag, 1956, Berlin)
- William P. Allis, editor Nuclear Fusion. (The Second Geneva Series on the Peaceful Uses of Atomic Energy) (Van Nostrand, 1960)
- William P. Allis, Solomon J. Buchsbaum and Abraham Bers Waves in Anisotropic Plasmas MIT Press, 1962
- Sanborn C. Brown, editor Electrons, Ions, and Waves: Selected Works of William Phelps Allis (MIT, 1967)
- George Bekefi Principles of Laser Plasmas (John Wiley, 1976). Contribution by William P. Allis: The Application of Electron Upflux to the Calculation of Excitation Frequencies in Glow Discharges pp235–256.
