= Edward Phelps Allis (zoologist) =

American zoologist

- Born: c. 1851; Milwaukee, Wisconsin
- Died: 1947
- Occupations: businessman; zoologist
- Known for: comparative anatomy and evolutionary morphology; Allis Lake Laboratory

Edward Phelps Allis (c. 1851–1947) was a leading comparative anatomist and evolutionary morphologist in the early twentieth century. Some of the illustrations in his publications were considered the best of lower vertebrates until at least the 1980s.

== Personal life and education ==
Allis was born in about 1851 in Milwaukee, Wisconsin. He was one of the children of Margaret (previously Watson) and Edward P. Allis, a very wealthy American businessman. He attended the Massachusetts Institute of Technology which gave him knowledge of engineering, and he was involved in business management through his father's enterprises. Ill health caused him to move to France in 1889. From 1919 onwards his eyesight deteriorated significantly. Allis died in 1947. He had married and had at least one child, William Phelps Allis.

== Scientific career ==
When Allis was 34, he founded a laboratory for biological research at his home, later called the Lake Laboratory or the Allis Lake Laboratory. Allis did not have any training in biology, but provided facilities for or employed several leading biologists. These included Charles Otis Whitman who was director of the laboratory from 1886 – 89 and William Patten who conducted research there from 1886 - 1889. Whitman had the opportunity to set up a well-equipped research laboratory and conduct his own research as well as assisting Allis. William Morton Wheeler lived locally and also conducted research there at this time. Allis was particularly interested in freshwater fish and his first publication described the anatomy of the bowfin fish in detail. The illustrations in this, and many of Allis's subsequent publications, were drawn and prepared for lithography by the Japanese artist Jujiro Nomura. At this time scientific journal publishing was starting in the USA and, with Whitman's encouragement, Allis provided the financial backing for a new publication, the Journal of Morphology that appeared from 1887 onwards. The journal was published regularly and made a financial loss, but Allis continued to support it financially up to the early 1900s.

In 1889 Allis moved to Palais Carnolés in Menton, France. He continued his scientific research employing Nomura and others to carry out dissections and illustrations as his own eyesight deteriorated.

Allis's research focused on homologies and evolution of vertebrate structural systems. The quality and accuracy of the illustrations and also his thought about the evolution of the vertebrate musculature, nostrils, vascular system and nerves continued to have impact on thought about vertebrate evolution into the late twentieth century.

During the Second World War, Allis remained in Menton until the Italian army arrived in 1940. Around 1943 most of his personal library and papers were taken to Germany by the German army. After Allis's death, his son returned to Menton in 1948 and retrieved his father's remaining papers, including original illustrations and notes.

== Legacy ==
Ellis's illustrations and notes, including unpublished material and working drawings in color, were given to A. S. Romer by his son around 1950. These were rediscovered in 1979 in the Museum of Comparative Zoology, Harvard University.

== Publications ==
Allis was author or co-author of at least 80 scientific publications, many illustrated by J. Nomura. These included:

- — (1897). "The cranial muscles and cranial and first spinal nerves in Amia calva". Journal of Morphology. 12 (3): 487–808. doi:10.1002/jmor.1050120302. ISSN 0362-2525.
- — (1901). "The lateral sensory canals, the eye-muscles, and the peripheral distribution of certain of the cranial nerves of Mustelus laevis". Quarterly Journal of Microscopical Science. 45: 87–236.
- — (1917). "The Lips and the Nasal Apertures in the Gnathostome Fishes, and Their Homologues in the Higher Vertebrates". Proceedings of the National Academy of Sciences. 3 (2): 73–78. Bibcode:1917PNAS....3...73P. doi:10.1073/pnas.3.2.73. ISSN 0027-8424. PMC 1091179. PMID 16586700.
- — (1923). "The cranial anatomy of Chlamydoselachus anguineus". Acta Zoologica. 4 (2–3): 123–221. doi:10.1111/j.1463-6395.1923.tb00161.x. ISSN 0001-7272.
