= Thomas Henry Allis =

British entomologist

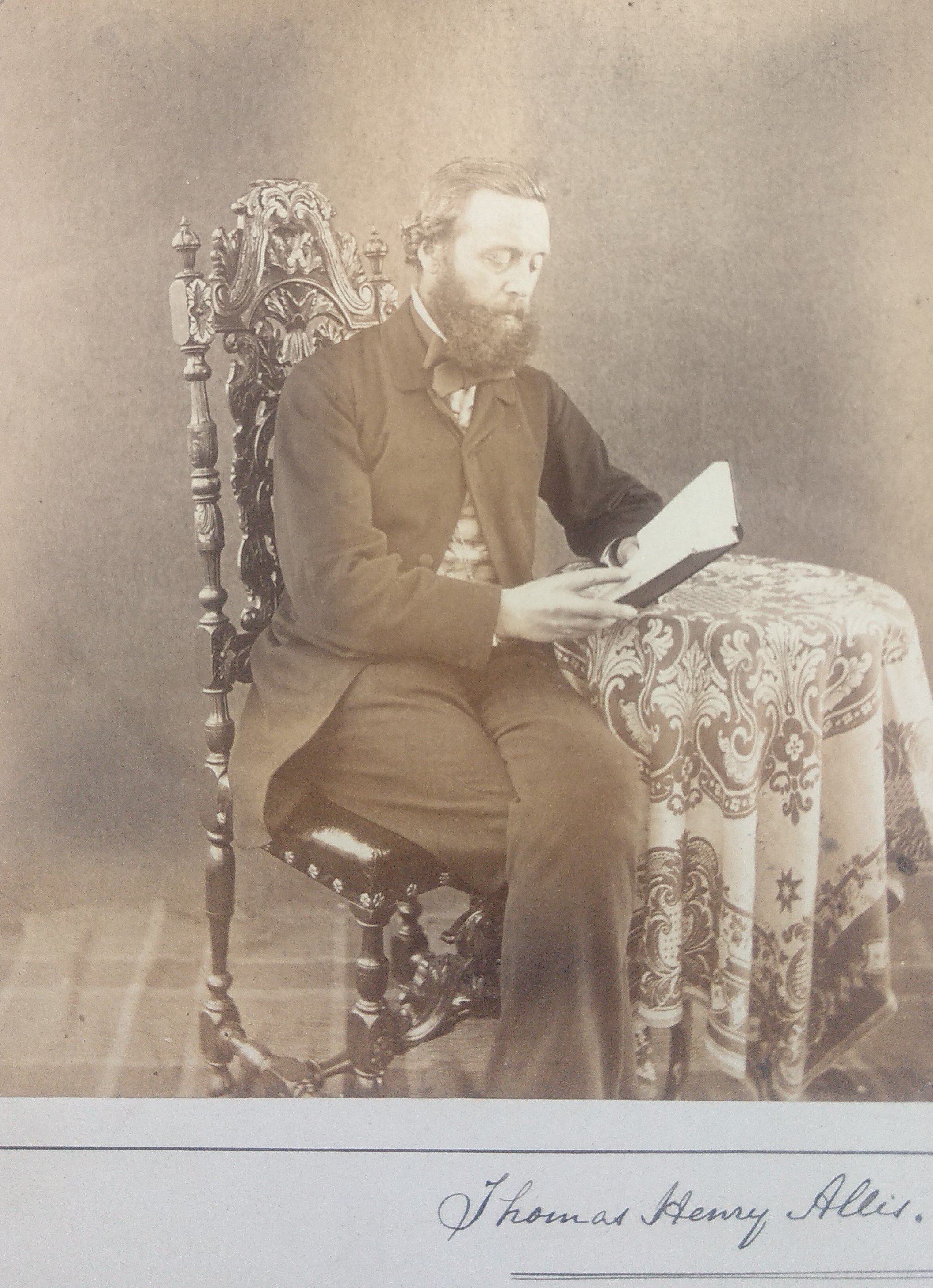
- An image of Thomas Henry Allis in the archive of the Yorkshire Museum
- Born: 15 January 1817
- Died: 1 August 1870 (aged 53); York
- Occupation: Entomologist

Thomas Henry Allis (15 January 1817 – 1 August 1870) was a British entomologist specialising in Lepidoptera.

== Biography ==
Allis was the son of Thomas Allis, a comparative anatomist at York. He attended Friend's School.

As an entomologist Allis was a member of the Entomological Society of London and the Entomological Society of Stettin. He amassed a large collection of lepidoptera, which was donation by his father to the Yorkshire Philosophical Society. The collection contained 19,585 specimens of 1,873 species of butterfly and moth. The collection is one of the largest biological collections in the Yorkshire Museum. The collection was used as the basis of an exhibition at Shandy Hall in 2005 titled 'The Winged Skull and 8000 other moths'. Allis had also donated specimens, in 1854, to the Entomological Society of London.

A species of moth, Exaeretia allisella, is named after Allis. He had caught the original specimens near Rotherham and Maryport and sent them to H.T. Stainton for his revision of the genus Exaeretia.

== Select publications ==
- Allis, T.H. 1869. "Note on Xylina conformis", The Entomologist's Monthly Magazine 5. 278
- Allis, T.H. 1870. "Lythria purpuraria, near York", The Entomologist’s Monthly Magazine 6. 238.
