= Albert H. Dolan =

American Catholic priest (1892–1951)

Albert Harold Dolan O.Carm (July 1, 1892 – January 22, 1951) was an American Catholic priest of the Carmelite order, the author of many popular books, and a prominent as well as early promoter of devotion to St. Thérèse of Lisieux, especially in the United States and Canada.

== Biography ==
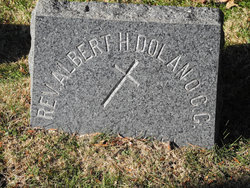
Gravestone of Rev. Albert H. Dolan

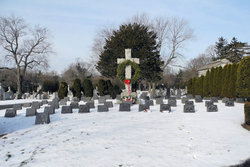
Mount Carmel Cemetery in Tenafly, NJ

Dolan was born on July 1, 1892, in Fond du Lac, Wisconsin. He attended grammar and high school in Syracuse, New York, after which he attended Niagara University. In 1918, he entered the Carmelite order. He was ordained a Catholic priest in 1919. He studied at the North American College in Rome and at St. Augustine's Seminary in Toronto. Father Dolan spent the majority of his time at St. Cecilia's Roman Catholic Church in Englewood, New Jersey. He died in White Plains, New York and is buried in Mount Carmel Cemetery in Tenafly, New Jersey.

A significant part of Dolan's life after he entered the Carmelite order focused on fostering devotion to St. Thérèse of Lisieux, also known as "The Little Flower." In an autobiographical essay, Dolan wrote, "Even before ordination I owed much to the intercession of St. Therese. Consequently I undertook to propagate devotion to her in America first through the spoken and later through the written word."

Dolan has been described as "Perhaps the greatest apostle of St. Therese in the new world." In 1923, while teaching public speaking and English at Mount Carmel College in Chicago, Dolan founded the Society of the Little Flower. Over many years, he established shrines to St. Thérèse of Lisieux in the United States, Canada, and France. For his research about St. Thérèse, Dolan traveled to France and interviewed four sisters of the saint; he wrote about these interviews in his book The Intimate Life of Saint Thérèse Portrayed by Those Who Knew Her (1944) . Dolan "devoted his priesthood to promoting devotion to St. Therese," wrote one obituary. Dolan founded and edited the first issues of The Sword, a quarterly journal within the Carmelite Order.

Dolan also founded the Matt Talbot Legion, "formed," as one of his obituaries explained, "to aid alcoholics through prayer and the inspiration of Matt Talbott's example." Dolan wrote two books about Matt Talbot: Matt Talbot, Alcoholic: The Story of a Slave to Alcohol who Became a Comrade of Christ (1947) and We Knew Matt Talbot: Visits with His Relatives and Friends (1948).

== Imposter scam ==
In 1929, there were several incidents of a man posing as a priest who claimed to be Dolan and who visited several convents. The man appeared to be trying to collect money supposedly for Mass intentions and he would sometimes bring copies of Dolan's books with him which he would autograph for the nuns.

== Selected works ==
Dolan considered Roses Fall Where Rivers Meet (1937) his best work. He said that his book Dare to Live! Is Our Religion a Burden or a Boon? (1941) was "suggested and inspired" by two books by Ida Friederike Görres, namely The Nature of Sanctity and The Burden of Belief.

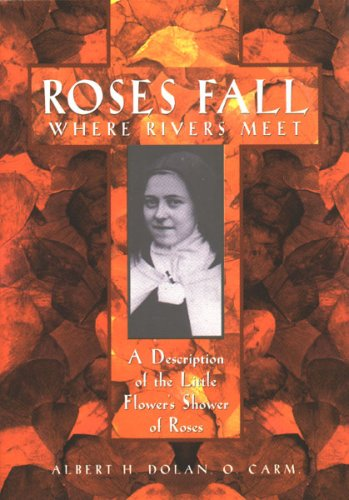
Cover of the book Roses Fall Where Rivers Meet by Rev. Albert H. Dolan.

He wrote 53 books. Most, if not all, of Dolan's books were published by Carmelite Press, based in Chicago and Englewood, New Jersey.

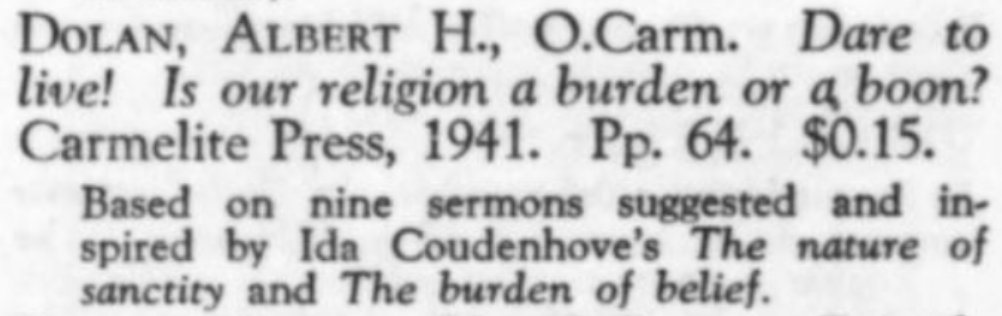
Announcement about Dare to Live! in Catholic Library World ,1941.

- Life of the Little Flower: (Saint Therese of the Child Jesus) (1926)
- The Living Sisters of the Little Flower (1926)
- An hour with the Little Flower : the Little Flower, a seraph of love (1926)
- The Little Flower's Mother (1927)
- Where the Little Flower Seems Nearest, a visit to the interior of the cloister of the famous Lisieux Carmel (1928)
- Our Sister Is in Heaven!: sequel to "the living sisters of the little flower" (1928)
- Scapular Facts (1929)
- Collected Little Flower Works (1929)
- Mobilize for Christ!: Communism and the Theresian Spirit (1936)
- Roses Fall Where Rivers Meet: a description and explanation of the shower of roses of the Little Flower (1937)
- All the Answers: about marriage and birth control (1937)
- Mother, I Belong to Thee : meditation on Mary at her home in Nazareth (1937)
- Enjoy the Mass (1937)
- You can be a Carmelite sister: A description of the life of the Carmelite Sisters of New York (1938)
- Happiness in Marriage : how to achieve it...how to increase it... (1940)
- Dare to Live! Is Our Religion a Burden or a Boon? (1941)
- Half Way to Happiness (1941)
- Friends and Enemies of Happiness (1941)
- More Friends of Happiness (1942)
- Homiletic Hints for Seminarians and Young Priests : the preparation, building and delivery of a sermon (1942)
- Little Treasury of Indulgence Prayers (1943)
- Saint Thomas More: The Greatest Catholic Layman in History The Patron Saint of Family Life (1943)
- Why We Are Catholics: a defense of fundamental Catholic teachings most frequently attacked (1944; first edition 1933)
- The Intimate Life of Saint Thérèse Portrayed by Those Who Knew Her (1944)
- Blind man with perfect vision : a study of the life of Saint Francis (1944)
- St. Therese : patroness of the missions (1945)
- A Modern Messenger of Purity: talks to the laity concerning the sixth commandment (1945)
- Sign of the Cross (1946)
- Matt Talbot, Alcoholic: The Story of a Slave to Alcohol who Became a Comrade of Christ (1947)
- God Made the Violet Too: Life of Leonie, Sister of St. Therese (1948)
- The Sisters of St. Therese Today (1948)
- We Knew Matt Talbot: visits with his relatives and friends (1948)
- St. Therese, Messenger of Mary (1949)
