= Mary Purcell =

Mary Purcell may refer to:

- Mary Tracey-Purcell (born 1949), Irish middle-distance runner
- Mary Purcell (biographer) (1906–1991), Irish teacher, biographer, and archivist
- La Wilson (Mary Alice Purcell, 1926–2018), American artist
