= Jennifer S. Bryson =

American academic

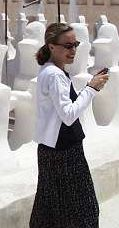
- Jennifer S. Bryson at the Amiriya Madrasa/Mosque in Radda, while working for the U.S. Embassy in Yemen.
- Occupations: Academic, U.S. government, interrogator
- Known for: served as an interrogator at Guantanamo

Jennifer S. Bryson is an American academic and translator specializing in the works of the twentieth-century German writer Ida Friedericke Görres. She is a Fellow in the Catholic Women's Forum of the Ethics and Public Policy Center. She previously worked at the Witherspoon Institute.

She founded Let All Play (now the Sports Policy Initiative), an organization that opposes rainbow flags and other political images on sports uniforms.

From 2004 to 2006, she served as an interrogator at the Guantanamo Bay detention camps and has since become an outspoken supporter of humane, rapport-building interrogation, and an opponent of the use of torture.

== Education and personal life ==
Bryson holds a B.A. in political science from Stanford University. She holds a M.A. in Medieval European intellectual history and a PhD in Greco-Arabic and Islamic studies, both from Yale University. She wrote her dissertation on the translation of medical texts in Greek, Arabic, and Latin. While Bryson was a columnist for the Yale Daily News in 1989–1990, her columns included a defense of motherhood against feminism and a defense of the right of Yale's secret societies such as Skull and Bones to remain all-male.

Bryson spent two years in Egypt learning the Arabic language in between her M.A. and Ph.D.

Bryson is a member of the Phi Alpha Theta honor society.

Bryson was raised a Lutheran, but grew apart from the faith as a teenager. She is an adult convert to Catholicism.

== Career ==
=== Television career ===
Bryson started working for as a television journalist and researcher in 2000. She worked for PBS NewsHour and CBS's 48 Hours.

=== Embassy work ===
Bryson worked at the U.S. Embassies in Egypt and Yemen in 2002.

=== Career at the Department of Defense ===
Bryson served as an interrogator in the Guantanamo Bay detention camps, from 2004 to 2006. In an interview, she stated that her conscience as a Roman Catholic led her decisions and actions at Guantanamo, where she managed a counter-terrorism interrogation and analysis team. Her last position with the Defense Department was as the lead Action Officer for countering ideological support to terrorism within the Office of the Secretary of Defense in Support to Public Diplomacy.

She has since become an outspoken supporter of humane, rapport-building interrogation, and an opponent of the use of torture.

=== Academic career ===
After her public service, Bryson became the director of the Islam and Civil Society Project at the Witherspoon Institute. She was previously a member of the board of directors of the Institute for Global Engagement. In August 2010 The Washington Post published an op-ed by Bryson, counseling tolerance for Muslims, after a Florida pastor had called on Americans to burn Qurans.

The Christian Post described Bryson as a "Christian scholar". In 2009 Bryson was on a panelist in a dialogue between evangelicals and Muslims. In September 2011 Bryson was a presenter at a conference on the role of non-Muslim scholars in Islamic Studies.

She is a Fellow in the Catholic Women's Forum of the Ethics and Public Policy Center.

== Writing and translations ==
=== Children's books ===
- Marvel, Believe, Care Creation Coloring Book. 2023.

=== Translations ===
- "Anti-Semitism Among Islamists in Germany". Translated by Bryson, Jennifer S. Hudson Institute. 2019.
- Görres, Ida Friederike (2020). "Trusting the Church: A Lecture". Logos: A Journal of Catholic Thought and Culture. 23 (4). Translated by Jennifer S. Bryson: 123–147. doi:10.1353/log.2020.0034. S2CID 243289416.
- Ratzinger, Joseph (2020). "Eulogy for Ida Friederike Görres". Logos. 23 (4). Translated by Jennifer S. Bryson: 148–151. doi:10.1353/log.2020.0036. S2CID 241709476.
- Görres, Ida Friederike (2023). The Church in the Flesh. Translated by Bryson, Jennifer S. Providence, Rhode Island: Cluny Media. ISBN 978-1685952501.
  - Bryson's translation of The Church in the Flesh includes a 1961 biographical essay about Görres by Alfons Rosenberg.
- Görres, Ida Friederike (2024). Gerl-Falkovitz, Hanna-Barbara (ed.). John Henry Newman: A Life Sacrificed. Translated by Bryson, Jennifer. San Francisco: Ignatius Press. ISBN 978-1-62164-698-3. OCLC 1467811206.

=== Articles ===
- Bryson, Jennifer S. (2011). "U.S. Engagement of Foreign Audiences: Post-9/11 Mistakes and Today's New Opportunities". The Muslim World. 101 (3): 390–393. doi:10.1111/j.1478-1913.2011.01387.x. ISSN 1478-1913.
- Bryson, Jennifer S. (2011-06-01). "Toward a Muslim Marketplace of Ideas". The Review of Faith & International Affairs. 9 (2): 1–2. doi:10.1080/15570274.2011.571414. ISSN 1557-0274.
- Bryson, Jennifer S. (2013-09-01). "Silenced: How Apostasy and Blasphemy Codes are Choking Freedom Worldwide". The Review of Faith & International Affairs. 11 (3): 84–85. doi:10.1080/15570274.2013.829986. ISSN 1557-0274.

== Anti-LGBT activism ==
Bryson is the founder of the Sports Policy Initiative, an anti-LGBT project that advocates against using activist symbols on sports uniforms and gear. She is the author of the 2019 report "Let All Play: Yes to Soccer, No to Politics" and the 2025 report published by EPPC, "Reclaim Team USA Sports from Activist Causes." She has also served on the advisory board of CanaVox, a reading group run by the Witherspoon Institute, which promotes media about marriage between one man and one woman.
