= The Burden of Belief =

Book by Ida Friederike Görres

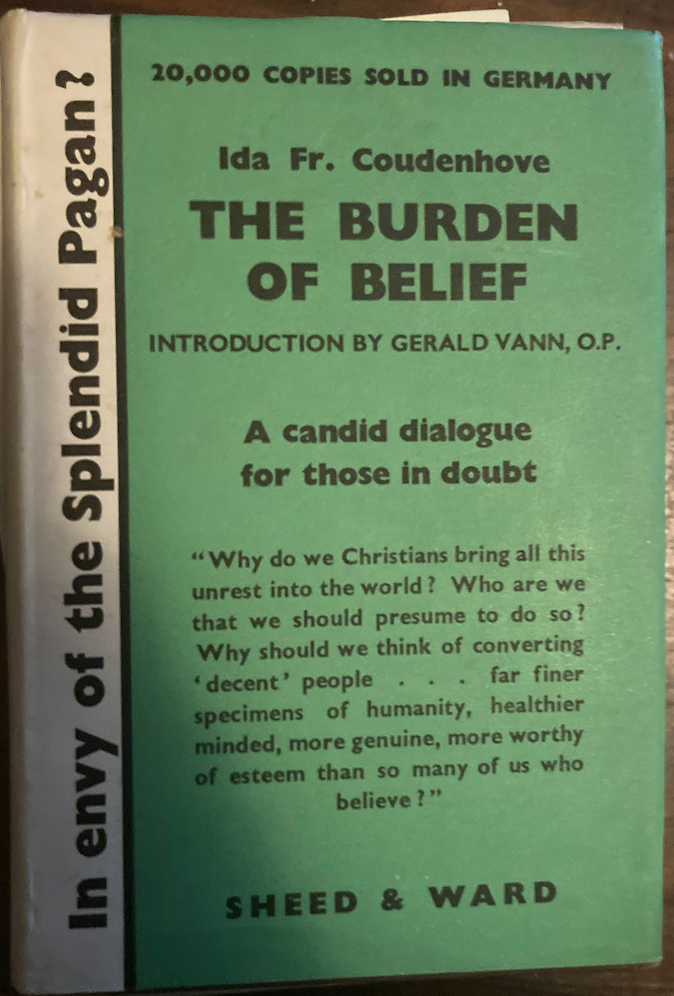
The cover of UK edition of The Burden of Belief published by Sheed & Ward in 1934.

The Burden of Belief is a book by the Catholic author Ida Friederike Görres (née von Coudenhove) about the challenges of Christian faith in the modern era. The book was first published in German in 1932 as Von der Last Gottes: Ein Gespräch über den Menschen und den Christen under the author's maiden name, Coudenhove. It was translated into English in 1934 by Conrad M.R. Bonacina. The British Dominican priest, Gerald Vann, OP, wrote the introduction to the English edition. It was also translated into French and Dutch.

The Burden of Belief, along with Coudenhove's book The Nature of Sanctity, inspired the book Dare to Live! Is Our Religion a Burden or a Boon? by the Carmelite priest, Albert H. Dolan, published in 1941.

== Vann's Introduction ==
In his Introduction, Vann praised The Burden of Belief, calling it a "dialogue, in which there is a depth and insight which make the honour of writing an introduction to it a difficult and humbling task." At the center of this book, he explains, "it is the reason of the Church’s desire to ‘teach all nations’ that is argued and explained."

== Synopsis ==
The Burden of Belief presents a dialogue between a Catholic man and a Catholic woman about matters of faith. Often, the author presents objections against the Catholic in rather convincing terms and then proceeds to make the Catholic point, after all, by effectively countering the objections.

The young woman admires well-groomed, full-blooded, and intellectually cultured people, and she fears that leading them to Catholicism would diminish their quality of life. The man begins by concurring, but then shows that she is actually propagating neo-paganist ideas, which tend toward egotism.

The book's style is literary, but seeks to avoid elitism. The author argues for the inclusive nature of the Catholic Church and concludes that instead of being a burden, faith is "a release from human limitations, because it is based on revelation. Following the light of that revelation—which rejects nothing good or natural—the Christian learns that 'the burden of God is the superabundance of Grace.'"

== Part of a quartet ==
Burden of Belief is part one of a four-part series Görres wrote about key aspects of the Catholic faith and Catholic life. Part two is The Nature of Sanctity, which was published as well as translated into English 1932 and reprinted in English in 2019. Part three is The Cloister and the World about discerning one’s vocation in life. Part Four, which has not yet been translated into English, is Des Andern Last. Ein Gespräch über die Barmherzigkeit.

== Translations ==
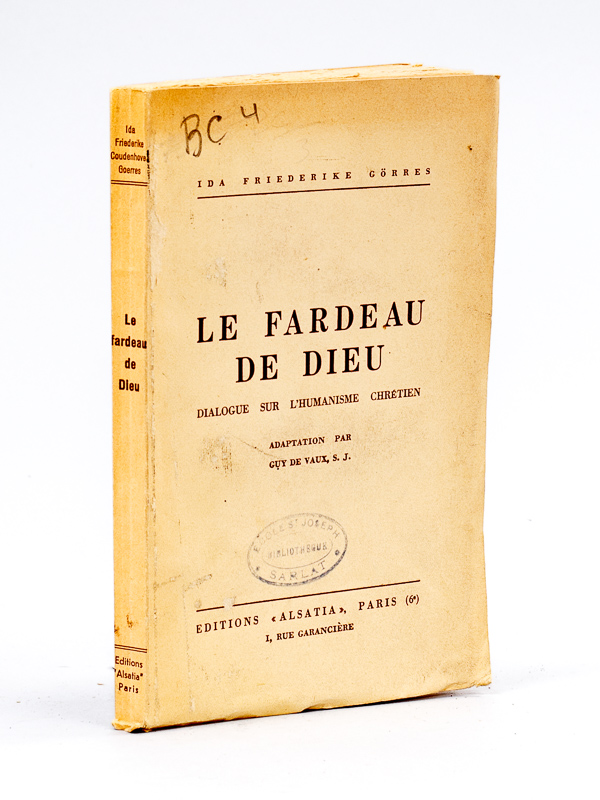
Cover of the 1938 French translation of The Burden of Belief.

In addition to being translated into English, The Burden of Belief was also translated from German into Dutch by Damiaan M. Hendrikx as De last Gods (1951) and into French by Guy de Vaux as Le Fardeau de Dieu (1938).

== Reception ==
The Times Literary Supplement called it "brilliant," noting that "both Christian and 'pagan' could read it with advantage." The reviewer writing for Anglican Theological Review called it "a very stimulating book" and noted it as an important example of a Catholic reception of the Protestant theologian Karl Barth.

The reviewer in The American Ecclesiastical Review stated that "Young Catholics ought to thank God for this book" and read it not just once, but "many times."

McSorley argued in his review for The Catholic World that the central question of the book is, “Is one justified in striving to bring into the Catholic Church those who in good faith are treading a path which by all human standards is a thoroughly noble one?" Görres’s answer through the man in the book is that if the call to the Church really comes from Jesus Christ, the Son of God, then there is no choice. McSorley concludes by saying that Christianity is really on the cusp of a new birth where there will be a summons to hardship.
