= Hidden face (disambiguation) =

Hidden face is an optical phenomena.

Hidden face or Hidden faces may also refer to:

- The Hidden Face, 1944 book by Ida Friederike Görres
- The Hidden Face, 2011 Colombian Spanish-language film directed by Andrés Baiz
- The Hidden Face, a 1916 American short film starring Henry W. Pemberton and Iva Shepard
- The Hidden Face (US title Burden of Proof), 1956 book by Victor Canning
- Hidden Faces (American TV series), a 1968–1969 American soap opera television series
- Hidden Faces (Hong Kong TV series), a 2015 Hong Kong medical drama television series
- Hidden Face, a 2024 South Korean film which is a remake of the 2011 Colombian-Spanish co-production above
