= Wild Orchid =

Wild Orchid may refer to:

- Wild orchid, a noncultivated orchid
- The Wild Orchid (book), a 1929 novel by the Norwegian author Sigrid Undset, winner of the 1928 Nobel Prize in Literature.
- Wild Orchids (film), a 1929 MGM film starring Greta Garbo
- Wild Orchid (film), a 1989 film starring Mickey Rourke and Carré Otis
- Wild Orchid (band), a vocal trio that featured Stacy Ferguson, later of the Black Eyed Peas
  - Wild Orchid (album), the debut album by the band
- Wild Orchids (album), a 2006 album by Steve Hackett
