= The Nature of Sanctity =

Austrian theology book

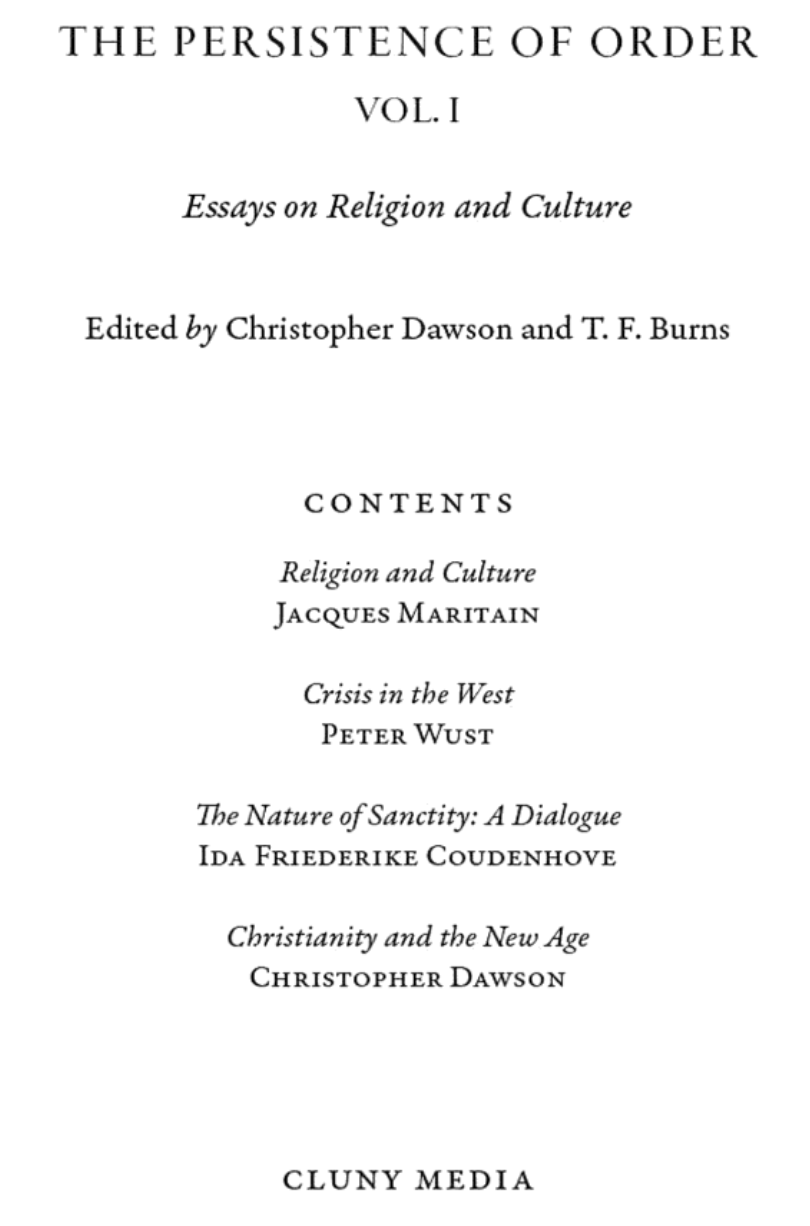
Title page of Essays in Religion and Culture, Persistence of Order vol. 1, edited by T.F. Burns and Christopher Dawson (Cluny Media, 2019).

The Nature of Sanctity: A Dialogue by the Catholic author Ida Friederike Coudenhove is a book about holiness and what it means to be a saint. It explores this topic through the lens of the life of St. Elizabeth of Hungary. Coudenhove is more well known today by her married name, Ida Friederike Görres.

The Nature of Sanctity was first published in English in 1932 by Sheed and Ward. It was translated from the German by Ruth Bonsall and Edward Ingram Watkin. This book was originally published in German in 1931 as Gespräch um die heilige Elisabeth. Ein Dialog über die Heiligkeit.

Catholic historian Christopher Dawson and T.F. Burns selected the short book The Nature of Sanctity to include as part of volume one, Essays on Religion and Culture, in the series The Persistence of Order. Essays on Religion and Culture was first published in 1932 by Sheed and Ward in London and then republished in 2019 by Cluny Media.

The English Dominican priest Gerald Vann, OP praised The Nature of Sanctity, writing that in Ida Coudenhove's "essay, The Nature of Sanctity, the humanness of Christian holiness was magnificently stated."

The Nature of Sanctity, along with the book The Burden of Belief by Ida Coudenhove, inspired the book Dare to Live! Is Our Religion a Burden or a Boon? from 1941 by the American Carmelite priest Rev. Albert H. Dolan; Regarding his inspiration for Dare to Live!, Dolan describes The Nature of Sanctity and The Burden of Belief as "magnificent volumes." Dare to Live! was republished in 2015 by Aeterna Press.

== Synopsis ==
The Nature of Sanctity is written as a dialogue between two individuals identified as "A" and "B." In this work, Coudenhove uses the life of St. Elizabeth of Hungary as the central topic of a debate about the nature of holiness as it relates to human nature, good deeds, sacrifice, and love for God and humankind. “A” argues that St. Elizabeth's human nature and sanctity were in conflict, and only by overcoming her humanness did she become a saint. “B” argues that St. Elizabeth's sanctity could only be made possible through the perfection of her human nature.The dialogue then explores whether St. Elizabeth and her husband Ludwig's marriage and access to wealth enabled or inhibited her path to holiness.

“A” and “B” argue whether sainthood is loving friendship with God, expressed through humility and sacrifice, and the nature of St. Elizabeth's banishment from Wartburg. Then, “B” argues that both Christians and non-Christians have a capacity for love of their neighbor, but that Christianity requires love of neighbor by all Christians. “A” responds that the gift of love of an individual hinders love of humankind. “A” and “B” then consider whether love of humanity, in the Christian sense, is actually love of God disguised as consideration for others. “A” concludes the dialogue by proposing that the saints’ living witness to Christ's life is the greatest gift the saints offer to Christians.

== Tetralogy ==
The Nature of Sanctity is part one of a four-part series Görres wrote about key aspects of the Catholic faith and Catholic life. Part two is The Burden of Belief (published in German in 1932 and translated into English 1934). Part three is The Cloister and the World about discerning one's vocation in life (published in German in 1934 and translated into English 1935). Part Four about mercy, which has not yet been translated into English, is Des Andern Last. Ein Gespräch über die Barmherzigkeit (1940).

== Reception ==
The Nature of Sanctity was well received. In addition to being included in the series The Persistence of Order, as mentioned above, it received positive reviews. For example:

In Studies: An Irish Quarterly Review, M.F.E. writes that, “Coudenhove's rapid but searching analysis of the ideas of sacrifice, of self-denial, and of human and divine love will help many to understand the problem more truly and to catch a glimpse of the solution.” In a review from 1934 in the Catholic magazine America, The Nature of Sanctity is described as “strong spiritual meat, and there is a deal of frank–at times, maybe a bit too frank–discussion; but this is needed badly if men and women of today are to be enticed at all to try to be saints.” Agnus Dun in Anglican Theological Review writes that The Nature of Sanctity’s “value lies in its interpretation of the dominant motives and inner tensions of the radically ascetic life.”

Also, The Nature of Sanctity received mention in The Times Literary Supplement of London in 1933, which wrote a short synopsis of the book.

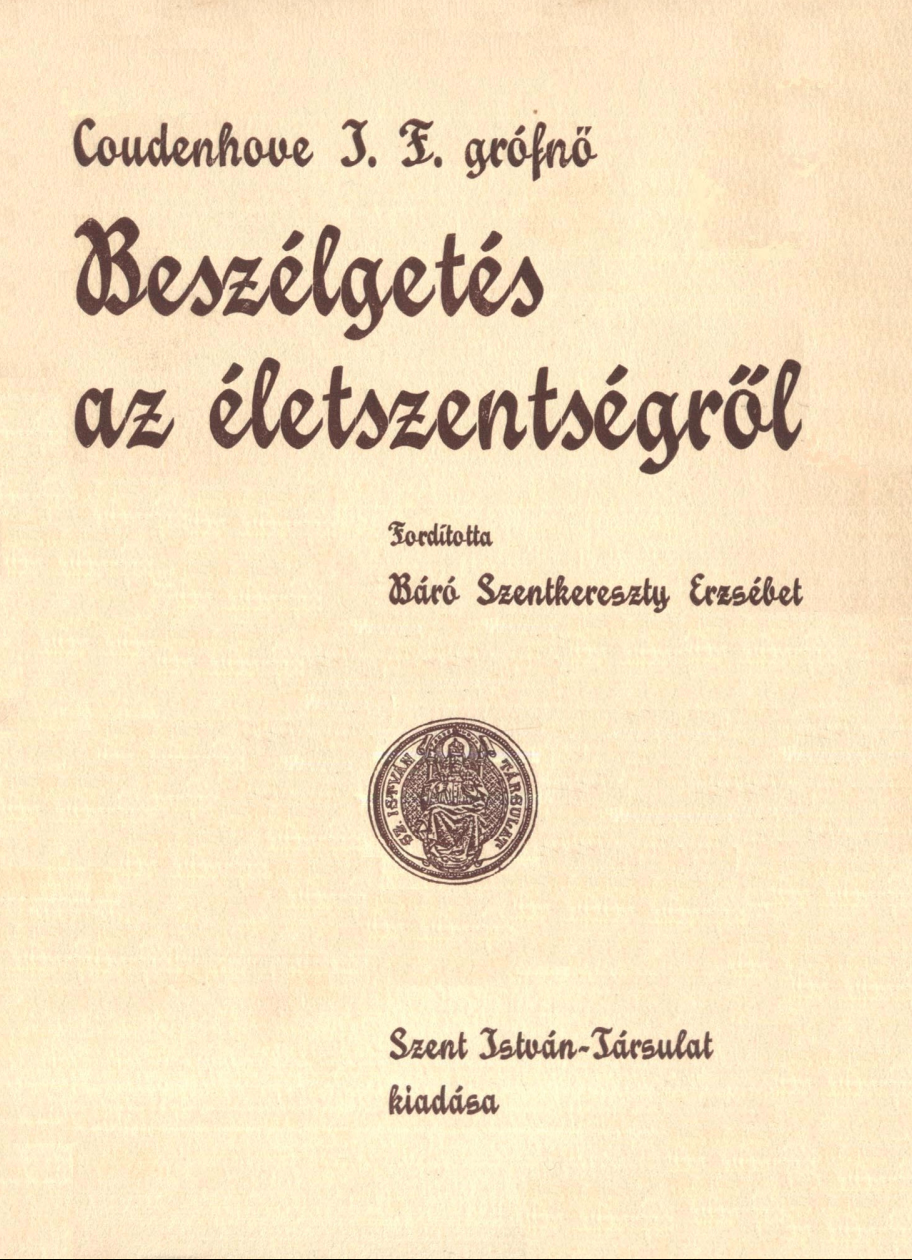
Cover of the Hungarian translation (1936) of The Nature of Sanctity.

== Translations ==
The Nature of Sanctity was also translated from German into Dutch (1936), French (1936), and Hungarian (1936).

- Dutch: Coudenhove, Ida Friederike. Over de Heiligheid: Gesprek over de Heilige Elisabeth van Thüringen. Translated by ’s-Gravenhage Sleutelbos. Eindhoven, Netherlands: Lecturis, 1936.
- French: Görres, Ida Friederike. Dialogue sur la sainteté. Translated by Anonymous. Paris, France: Éditions “Alsatia,” 1936.
- Hungarian: Coudenhove, Ida Friederike. Beszélgetés Az életszentségről: Párbeszéd Szent Erzsébetről. Translated by Szentkereszty Erzsébet. Budapest, Hungary: Szt. István Társ, 1936.
