= Maria Birgitta zu Münster =

Catholic convert, Benedictine nun, and translator (1908–1988)

Maria Birgitta zu Münster, OSB (13 October 1908 – 27 January 1988): née Ursula zu Münster, was a Catholic convert, Benedictine nun, and translator.

== Life ==
Ursula zu Münster was born in Hanover. Her father, Egon Graf zu Münster, was a lieutenant colonel. She had two brothers. Ursula was educated at the protestant Stift Altenburg (in Thuringia), where she was also confirmed in 1924; she later attended grammar school in Dresden. It was in the Dresden house of the protestant preacher Arndt von Kirchbach and his socially and literarily active wife Esther that Ursula zu Münster met her friend Ida Friederike Görres. After graduating from high school, she studied Protestant theology in Greifswald and Leipzig from 1928 to 1932.

Ursula zu Münster converted to Roman Catholicism in Dresden in 1934. She studied at the Social Women's School of the Catholic Women's Association in Munich in 1934/36. Its director, Dr. Ammann, became her godmother at the confirmation in Cardinal Faulhaber's private chapel in 1935. After her final exams, she worked enthusiastically as a social worker, among others with female migrant workers in Eisleben and with female prisoners.

After frequent visits and persistent pleading, she was accepted into Saint Walburg Abbey in Eichstätt by her relative, the Abbess M. Benedicta von Spiegel. Her novitiate began in 1937 and ended with religious vows in 1938. She received the name of St. Bridget of Sweden. One of her first major assignments in the abbey was being editor of the abbey magazine, the Walburgisblätter. During the Second World War, Sr. Bridget and some of her fellow sisters worked as ward sisters in the reserve hospital in Bruck-Berg near Amberg from 1942 to 1944, caring first for Spanish, then German soldiers. After the war, Sr. Bridget helped numerous refugees in word and deed.

The main focus of her work during the 50 years of her profession was literary and historical. She wrote commemorative publications for anniversaries and jubilees. For decades she organised the numerous monastery festivals with a wealth of ideas. Magazines requested articles from her for saints' and church festivals and for the Sunday Gospels.

In 1979 she was the first woman to be admitted to the Bavarian Benedictine Academy.

== Selection of works ==
=== As author ===
- Ewigkeit, in die Zeit leuchte hell herein. Herderverlag 1954.
- About the Benedictine nunnery of Holzen, especially regarding the 18th century. Studien und Mitteilungen zur Geschichte des Benediktinerordens und seiner Zweige 84 (1973), pp. 407–432.
- Abbess Maria Anna Augustina Weihermüller, 1950–1985, St. Walburg Eichstätt. Studien und Mitteilungen zur Geschichte des Benediktinerordens und seiner Zweige 98 (1987), p. 376.
- On the election and consecration of Abbess Maria Anna Franziska (Salesia) Kloos in the jubilee year of the 950th anniversary of St. Walburg Abbey in Eichstätt. Studien und Mitteilungen zur Geschichte des Benediktinerordens und seiner Zweige 96 (1985), p. 432.
- (with Andreas Bauch): Heilige Walburga: Leben und Wirken. Eichstätt, Abtei St. Walburg, 1985.
- St. Walburg and its Abbesses and Prioresses since the Secularisation. Studien und Mitteilungen zur Geschichte des Benediktinerordens und seiner Zweige 97 (1986), p. 253.
- "Ein Zeugnis des Dankes für lange Strecken eines gemeinsamen Weges." In Wanderwege: Festgabe zum 60. Geburtstag von Ida Friederike Görres, edited by Alfons Rosenberg. Zürich: Thomas-Verlag, 1961, 15–23.

=== Translations French to German ===
- Réginald Garrigou-Lagrange, Die drei Bekehrungen und die drei Wege. Freiburg, Herder, 1948.
- René Voillaume, Leben von Charles de Foucauld. Freiburg im Breisgau, Herder, 1957.
- Louis Thomassin, Über das göttliche Offizium und seine Verbindung mit dem inneren Gebet (On the Divine Office and its connection with inner prayer) Patmos-Verlag, 1952.
- Louis Ponnelle, Louis Bordet, Der heilige Philipp Neri und die römische Gesellschaft seiner Zeit (1515–1595), ed. Ulrike Wick-Alda (Münster translated parts). Bonn, nova et vetera, 2015.

=== Translations English to German ===
- John Henry Newman, Maria im Heilsplan. Series: Zeugen des Wortes. Freiburg im Breisgau, Herder, 1953.
- Book chapter: “Ein Zeugnis des Dankes für lange Strecken eines gemeinsames Weges.” In: Wanderwege. Festschrift zum 60. Geburtstag von Ida Friederike Görres, ed. Alfons Rosenberg. Zürich, München, Paderborn, Thomas Verlag, 1961, pp. 15–23.
