= Mary Purcell (biographer) =

Irish teacher, religious biographer and archivist

- Born: 28 May 1906; Carrigeen, County Kilkenny, Ireland
- Died: 19 March 1991 (aged 84); Dublin
- Education: Carysfort College
- Occupation: Teacher

Mary Purcell (28 May 1906 – 19 March 1991) was an Irish teacher, biographer, and archivist.

== Life ==
Mary Purcell was born in Carrigeen, County Kilkenny, on 28 May 1906. Her parents were schoolteachers, Richard and Mary Purcell (née Rafter). She had one older sister, who also became a teacher, and a brother, sports journalist and novelist, Patrick. Her family were related to Walter McDonald. She was educated at St Louis Convent in Monaghan, before enrolling in Carysfort College in Blackrock, County Dublin, for teacher training. She went on to teach in Dublin and Kilkenny from 1928 to 1958. From 1935 until her death, she lived at 32 Gardiner Street.

Some accounts claim that Purcell began writing to pay off gambling debt. Her first book was a murder mystery, The pilgrim came late (1946). In researching this book, Purcell attended a public vigil at Mountjoy Prison. The next two books were fictional biographies. The first, The halo on the sword (1950), was about St Joan of Arc and won the US Catholic Book of the Month award and the French Academy's Palmes Academiques. After these, Purcell focused on biographies, and was commissioned by Archbishop John Charles McQuaid in 1953 to write a biography of Matt Talbot, Matt Talbot and his times (1954). McQuaid restricted Purcell's use of sources to only the typed records of the tribunal of inquiry. She later reissued the book as a more comprehensive study in 1990. Other religious biographies she wrote included the lives of Blessed Peter Favre, St Ignatius of Loyola, St Francis Xavier and Gonzalo de Cordoba. Her biography of de Cordoba received the award of the Real Academia de Cordoba from the Spanish government. From 1947 to 1965, she was an assistant editor of Pioneer. Her biography of Mother Mary Martin was published in 1987.

From the 1960s, Purcell was the catechetical supervisor to the Dublin diocese. She retired at the same time as McQuaid, in 1972. In 1960, she was appointed a supervisor for the higher diploma in catechetics in the department of education at University College Dublin. Purcell wrote a series of 6 doctrinal books and teachers’ guides for primary level, and co-authored books 4–6 with Brother J. C. Moore. In the late 1960s, she published a number of instructional pamphlets for parents and children as part of the Irish Messenger series.

Archbishop Dermot Ryan invited Purcell to work in the diocesan archives in 1973. For 12 years she worked cataloguing the letters of Archdeacon John Hamilton and Archbishop Daniel Murray, with the two calendars being serialised in Archivium Hibernicum from 1981. In 1961 she was awarded the Pro Ecclesia et Pontifice by Pope John XXIII. On 14 November 1989 she was awarded an honorary doctorate of philosophy from the Pontifical University of Maynooth, the third recipient and first woman to receive the honour. She died in Dublin on 19 March 1991.

== Selected publications ==
- The pilgrim came late (1946)
- The halo on the sword (1950)
- Matt Talbot and his times (1954)
- To Africa With Love (1987)
