= The Hidden Face (book) =

Biography of Therese of Lisieux (1944)

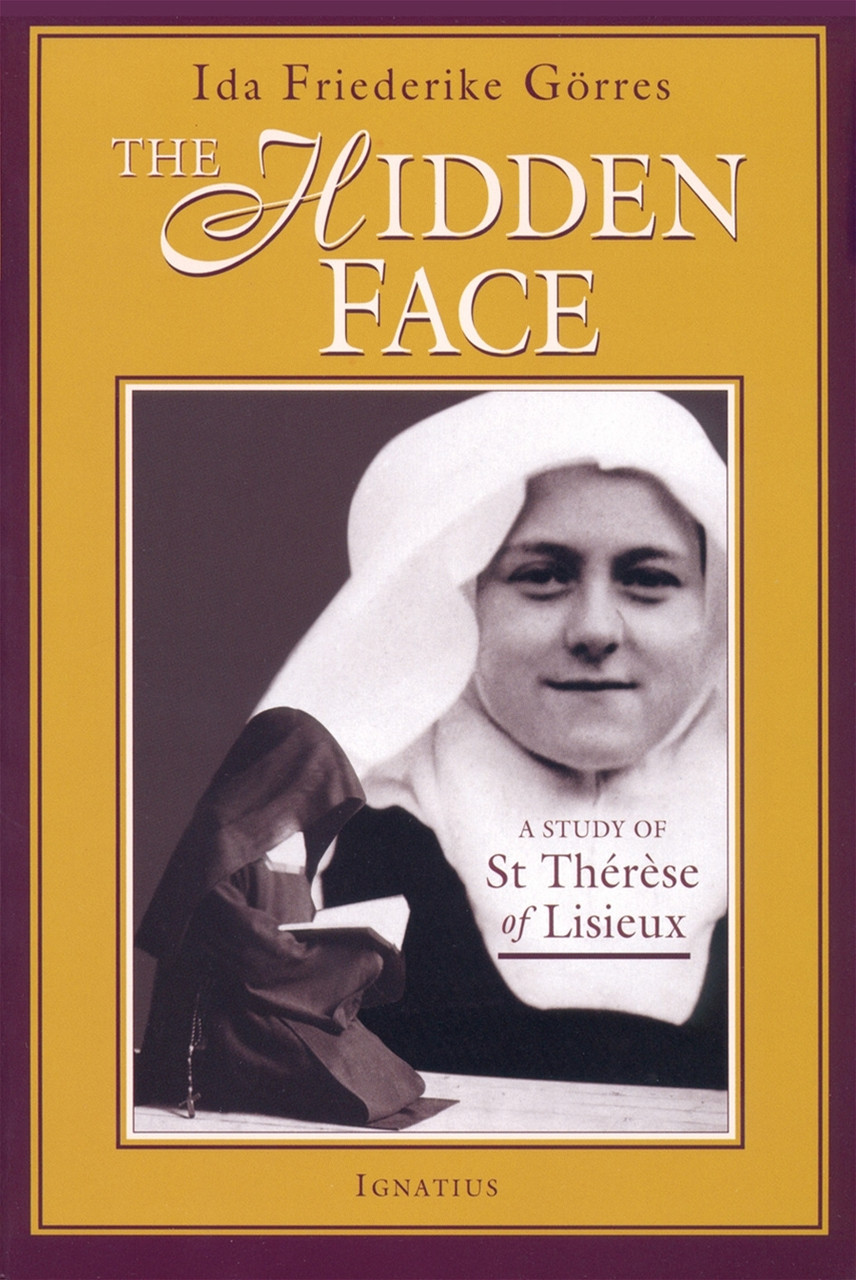
The cover of the reissue of The Hidden Face (Ignatius Press, 2003) (translated by Richard and Clara Winston)

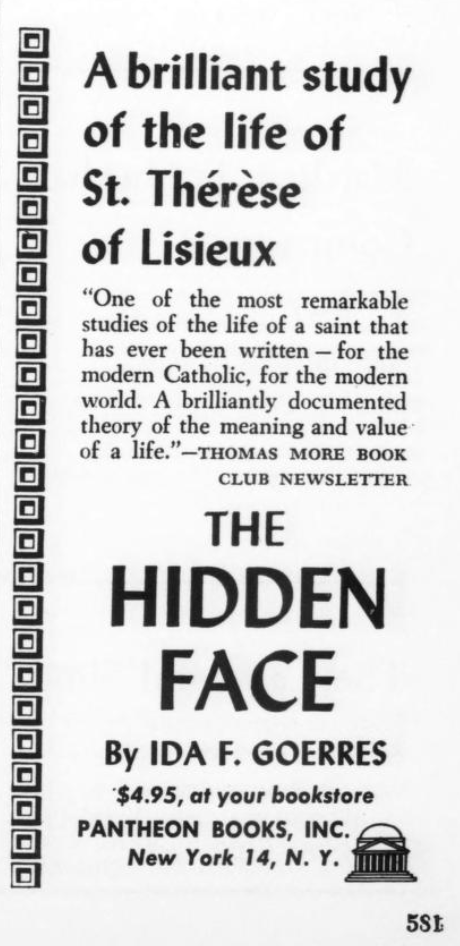
An advertisement for The Hidden Face in America Magazine on February 14, 1959.

The Hidden Face is a biography of Saint Thérèse of Lisieux by the Catholic author Ida Friederike Görres (1901 Bohemia – 1971 Germany). Görres first published this book in German in 1944 as Das verborgene Antlitz; in the eighth edition in German in 1958, it was renamed Das Senfkorn von Lisieux: Das verborgene Antlitz. Neue Deutung in German. An English version, translated by Richard and Clara Winston, was published in 1959; this was republished by Ignatius Press in 2003. The Hidden Face is considered to be Görres's most important work.

The central question that prompted Görres to write The Hidden Face was, “Who was Thérèse of the Child Jesus in reality?” The book contains seven chapters.

== Synopsis ==
=== I. The Question ===
“The cult of Little Thérèse has from the first been a mass movement." In the first chapter, Görres explores the widespread fascination with St. Thérèse following her death in 1897. Görres presents the paradox that St. Thérèse never “did anything that struck her contemporaries as extraordinary” yet was the subject of an “incredible storm of veneration."

=== II. The Nest ===
In the second chapter, Görres identifies and examines three stages in Thérèse's childhood. Regarding the first stage of early childhood, Görres notes that the saint's later doctrine of the "way of spiritual childhood" was based on the experience of an "unmerited, unmeritable, anticipatory, unconditional and immutable" love as a toddler. Görres refers to the second part of Thérèse's childhood as the “saddest time of her life” lasting from age five to fourteen. The author asserts that the death of Thérèse's mother unlocked a “dangerous, abnormal sensitivity” in the child that plagued her during this period. The third and final stage of Thérèse's childhood was a time in which the young teenager “regained her self" and received "the grace of complete conversion."

=== III. The Desert ===
"It was the desert itself, not storms or dangerous beasts, that met her in the Carmel. She did not 'suffer from life', as do melancholics and those who are oversensitive; but she suffered life as simple and childlike folk must...suffered the permanence and inescapability of its demands, its irreconcilable contradictions, its stubborn disharmonies, its bleak destitution..."

Görres summarizes Thérèse's life in Carmel in this chapter, noting the trials faced by Thérèse in confronting strict treatment from the prioress and continued coddling from her family. The author also dedicates a section of the chapter to studying the puzzling personality of Mother Marie de Gonzague, who was prioress for many of Therese's years in the convent.

=== IV. The Way ===
Görres highlights Thérèse's complete obedience in Carmel, particularly in the form of "complete and pure submission to the authority of God as represented by her appointed superiors." Görres claims that the saint practiced love of neighbor "for almost her entire life...solely out of obedience" through intentional acts such as sitting beside difficult sisters during the recreation hour. After exploring Thérèse's love for Scripture, Görres briefly examines Thérèse's religious titles of the Child Jesus and the Holy Face, stating that they "imply a consecration and an imitation," respectively.

=== V. The Breakthrough ===
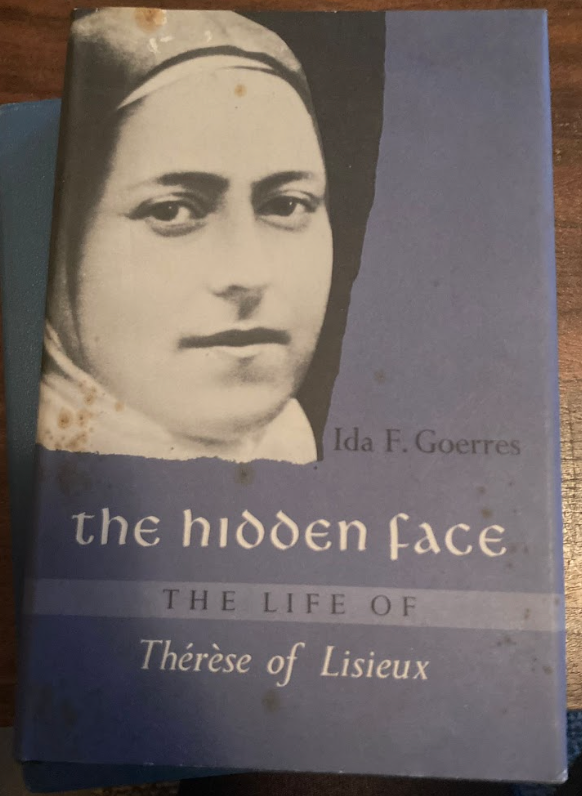
Cover of the 1959 edition of The Hidden Face published in the UK.

In the beginning of this chapter, Görres expands on Thérèse's oblation as a voluntary victim to the divine mercy of God. The author also considers Thérèse's vocation of love, which manifested itself through loving and suffering for souls. Görres dedicates a section to analyzing the meaning of Thérèse's smile and outward reserve, subsequently discussing her role as novice mistress. In the final part of the chapter, Görres outlines and elaborates on Thérèse's famous "Little Way."

=== VI. Perfection ===
Görres asserts that Thérèse's way would have remained hidden if not for the tuberculosis that caused her death at age twenty-four. While describing the effects of the fatal disease over time, Görres explores the mystery of suffering in the context of Thérèse's experience. Thérèse's spiritual struggle with uncertainty about personal immortality is also discussed in this section.

=== VII. The Riddle of Glory ===
In the quiet life of Thérèse there was revived the ancient, original, Gospel concept of sanctity, of the baptized Christian whose whole life reflects Christ in all its elements, who is saintly not because he does or says special things which set him off from others, but because he is a tiny member of Christ present in the world and because he endeavors to walk worthily in the path of his vocation.

Görres admits that human efforts played a significant role in the origination and propagation of the devotion to Thérèse, but she also credits divine providence and confirmation as vital to the flourishing of the movement. In this chapter, Görres also claims that the particular circumstances of the saint's life allowed Thérèse to express a message that represents a hidden and widespread number of faithful members of the Church from throughout the centuries.

== Reception ==
In 1990, psychologist Fr. Benedict Groeschel, C.F.R., praised the book not only as an account of St. Thérèse but, in addition, he wrote, “One of the most outstanding biographies of a saint ever written is The Hidden Face, the life of Thérése of Lisieux, by Ida F. Goerres." In 1985, John F.X. Harriett, in his column in the UK Catholic magazine The Tablet, called The Hidden Face the "most outstanding" of all biographies of saints.

At the time the English translation of The Hidden Face was released in 1959, there were many positive reviews in the UK and the USA. For example:

- In the assessment of reviewer Paul R. Rust, The Hidden Face is “unquestionably the finest contribution yet to the voluminous writings on the Little Flower.”
- In the Catholic magazine The Lamp, a reviewer identified The Hidden Face as among the “books which help toward increasing our knowledge of Christ.”
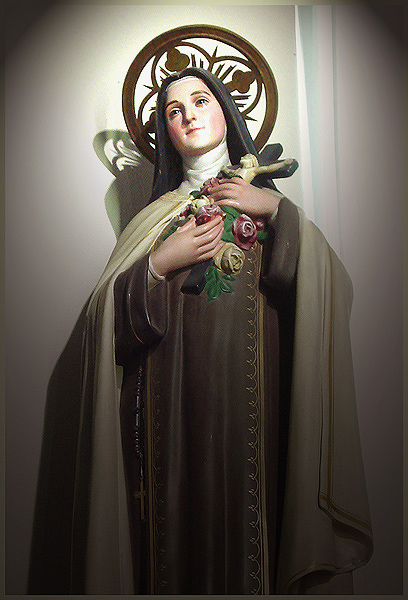
  "...so different from the honeyed insipidity of the usual representations of her" - "Who was Thérèse of the Child Jesus in reality?" (The Hidden Face p. 21)
  The prominent English Roman Catholic priest Cyril Charlie Martindale noted that the writing of the book “added, most valuably, to the mountain of books piled above St. Thérèse of Lisieux.”
- According to a review by S.M. Albert, the book “is original, profound, stimulating, and one can scarcely imagine its being bettered as a serious biographical study.”
- In the Catholic publication Dominicana, a reviewer referred to The Hidden Face as “a powerfully convincing book” and “an untouched portrait of a great saint, removed from all the savors of poor hagiography and pious sentimentality."
- Regarding The Hidden Face, reviewer Luke Rigby, O.S.B., “felt more sure that nobody has expressed more honestly, clearly and lovingly the essential significance and attraction of this saint.”
- In the Jesuit periodical Woodstock Letters, Gerard Giblin called the book “one of the most comprehensive to appear to date,” adding that it would “be many years before it is replaced.”
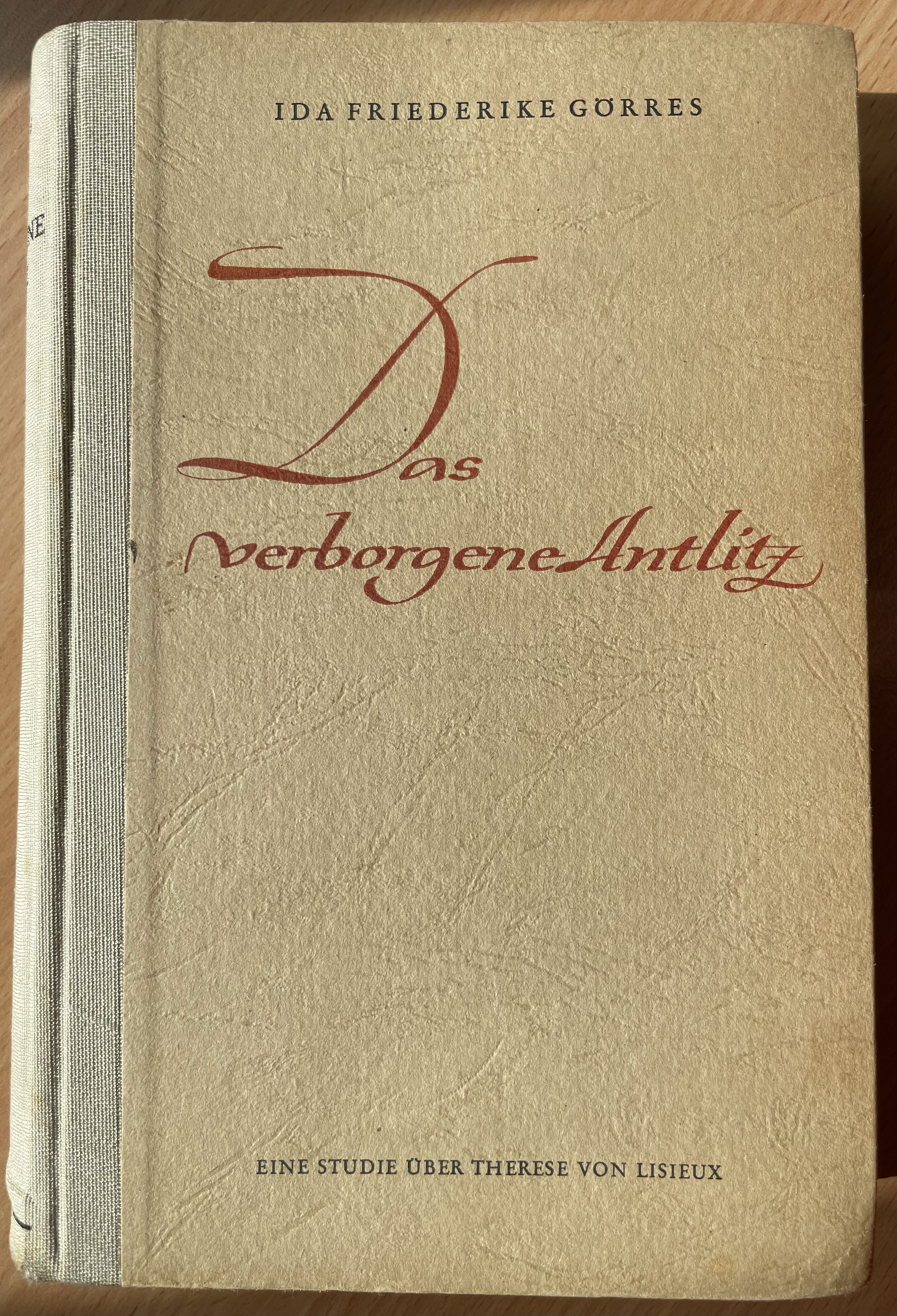
  Cover of the 2nd edition in German, 1946.
- Reviewer Sister Mary William called the book “a very satisfying experience” and that in the book “Therese’s life and character are examined objectively” more than any other book she had read.
- American theologian Donald Bloesch asserted that Görres “gives an acute psychological and profound theological appraisal of the life and message of St. Therese in her book The Hidden Face.”

== Translations ==
The Hidden Face has also been translated from German also into Dutch, Indonesian, Japanese, and Portuguese:

- Dutch: Het Verborgen Gelaat: Schets Tot Een Levensbeeld van Thérèse van Lisieux. Translated by André Noorbeek. Utrecht, Netherlands: Het Spectrum, 1950.
- Indonesian: Wajah tersembunyi: kehidupan Teresia Lisieux. Translated by Anonymous. Vol. 2. Seri teresiana. Yogyakarta, Indonesia: Kanisius, 1984.
- Japanese: 隠された顔 / Kakusareta Kao. Translated by Seijiro Yoshizawa. Tokyo, Japan: Kajima Kenykujo Shuppankai, 1969.
- Portuguese: Teresa de Lisieux. Translated by Manuel Seabra. Homens de Deus. Lisbon, Portugal: Editorial Sater, 1961.

== Sources ==
- Ida Friederike Görres, The Hidden Face: A Study of St. Thérèse of Lisieux. Ignatius Press, 2003 ISBN 0-89870-927-X
