= Alfons Rosenberg =

Alfons Rosenberg (1902–1985) was a German-Jewish writer from Munich who wrote Die Welt im Feuer (1983, The World in Fire). An expert on symbolism, he wrote over forty works. He made important contributions to the understanding of Mozart's operas.

== Life ==
Succeeding unwillingly to his father's shoe-making business, he much preferred the life of an artist. He studied and enjoyed the fine arts and dancing and was also semi-involved in agriculture. His career as a lecturer and a writer began in 1942. He had moved to an island on Lake Wörth, near Munich, to evade the National socialists, but in 1935 he had to flee abroad and found a safe haven in Switzerland, where he earned his living through his art and handicrafts. He was a part of the intellectual discussion group Eranos, through which he became acquainted with C. G. Jung, Olga Fröbe-Kapteyn, Hugo Rahner and other renowned people. Co-operation with the group inspired him to study Protestant theology and Christian spirituality. He converted to Catholicism in 1943.

He spent his life lecturing about symbolism, love and meditation throughout the German-speaking world. In his classic studies, Die Zauberflöte - Geschichte und Deutung von Mozarts Oper (1964, The Magic Flute - History and Interpretation of Mozart's Opera) and Don Giovanni - Mozarts Oper und Don Juans Gestalt (1968, Don Giovanni - Mozart's Opera and the Don Juan Figure) as well as in some shorter works, he made major contributions to the understanding of the symbolism of Mozart's operas.

In his little book Die Zauberflöte und die Geheimwissenshaften (1972, The Magic Flute and the Secret Sciences), immediately after quoting the telling words of Ludwig Börne, "Mozart's music reflects back everyone's own and present feelings like a mirror, but somewhat ennobled; we recognise in it the poetry of existence", Rosenberg adds his own comment: "In other words, ever since Mozart's time men have in his music recognised their true condition and state cleared of everything that can tarnish it from without; the sensual man recognises himself as the godlike man he has been called to be by nature."

== Friendship with Ida Friederike Görres ==
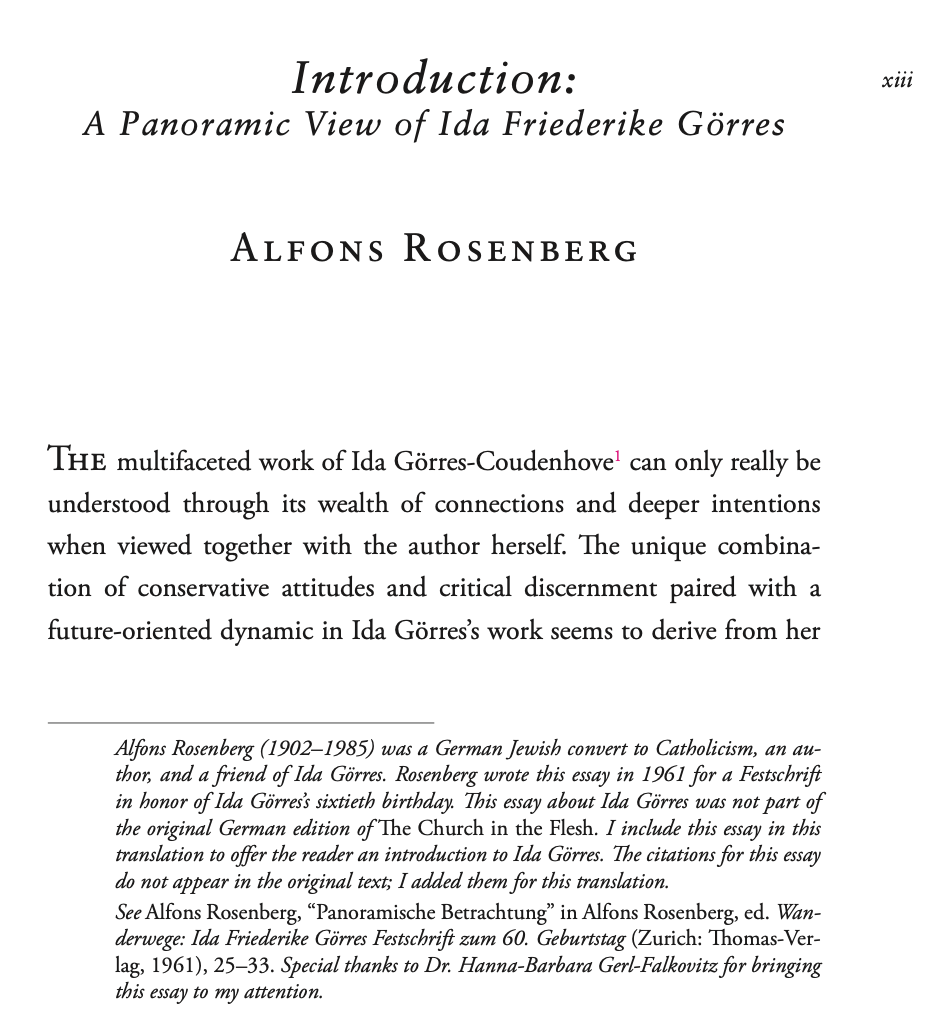
The first page of the English translation of Rosenberg's essay "A Panoramic View" about Ida Friederike Görres, published in 2023.

Rosenberg was friends with the Catholic author Ida Friederike Görres. He edited the Festschrift for her sixtieth birthday in 1961 and in this Festschrift, he wrote a biographical essay about Görres titled, "Panoramische Betrachtung" ("A Panoramic View"). Rosenberg's essay was translated into English in 2023 and published as an introduction to the English translation of Görres's book The Church in the Flesh.
