= The Wild Orchid (book) =

Novel by Sigrid Undset

The Wild Orchid is a novel by the Norwegian author Sigrid Undset, winner of the Nobel Prize in Literature in 1928.

Undset first published the novel in Norwegian as Gymnadenia in 1929. The book was translated into English by Arthur G. Chater and published in English in New York in 1931 by Alfred A. Knopf.

The Wild Orchid is Part One of a two-part series. The second book in the series is The Burning Bush.

== Synopsis ==
The Wild Orchid, set in Norway shortly before and then up to the First World War, tells the first part of the story of Paul Selmer. Paul is the son of bourgeois, modern-minded Protestant parents. After his parents divorce when he is a teenager, Paul, along with his sister and two brothers, is raised by his mother, Julie. She is an emancipated woman who encourages her children to be freethinkers.

As Paul begins to find his way as a young man, he works and has a girlfriend/mistress. At this point, religion plays no meaningful role in Paul's life. Paul considers studying further but then instead goes into business. Paul marries a young woman named Bjorg, who is from a very different background. They are quite different from each other and it is not an easy relationship, but Paul takes his marriage vow seriously and perseveres.

Along the way, be begins yearning for something deeper and more meaningful in life. Via his encounters with members of the small Catholic community in Norway, Paul begins to see that if Christianity is indeed true, that it is something rich and serious.

== Title of the novel ==
According to reviewer Vergilia Peterson Ross, the flower from which the book derives its title, The Wild Orchid, serves "as a symbol of human disillusion;" she continued, "When young Paul ... first hears the wild orchid’s name, gymnadenia, he imagines a redolent, sweet blossom of dazzling form. But the gymnadenia turns out a whitish little flower, frail and almost scentless. He is disappointed. Later, in the chaos of a first passion, he finds that his love, too, pales in the face of a tenuous reality." (Gymnadenia is the Latin name for wild orchid and the title of the book in the original Norwegian version.)

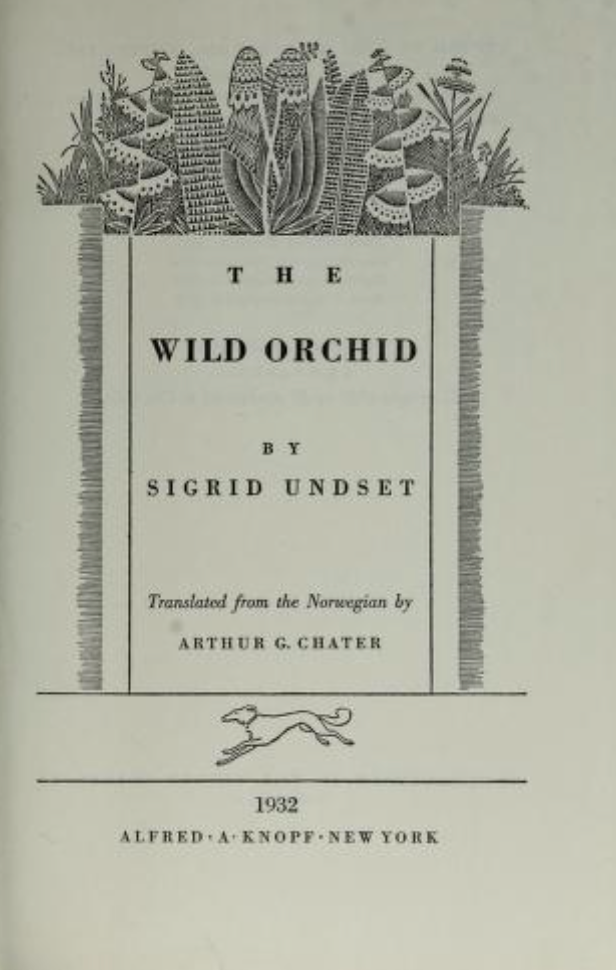
Title page of the 1932 edition of the novel The Wild Orchid by Sigrid Undset.

Another reviewer explained the title The Wild Orchid this way: Paul's "disappointment, when a boy, in the blossoms of the wild orchid to which he had looked forward with such enthusiasm, is the symbol of the lack which he feels in earthly love. The burning bush," the title of the sequel, "symbolizing heavenly love, will follow."

== Reception ==
Reviewers of the English edition were largely positive. Several noted both comparisons and contrasts with Undset's earlier series Kristin Lavransdatter and The Master of Hestviken set in medieval Norway. Reviewer Mary Kolars wrote of The Wild Orchid, by comparison, that "this, soberer, less glamorous chronicle confirms one’s sense of the novelist’s truly extraordinary powers. There is the same encompassing, inexhaustible knowledge of each separate soul ..."

In an article about The Wild Orchid published in 1930 in the journal Die Schildgenossen (a journal of the Catholic Youth Movement in Germany), the Catholic author Ida Friederike Görres observed that despite the contrast between the dramatic medieval setting of the earlier two series by Undset, "grand, warlike, and wild," and the "small, bourgeois, and tame" setting of The Wild Orchid, what connects these novels by Undset is that "the encounter with God is always the same."
