= Ida Friederike Görres =

Austrian writer and noble (1901–1971)

- Born: 2 December 1901; Ronsperg, Bohemia
- Died: 15 May 1971 (aged 69); Frankfurt, Germany
- Resting place: Bergäcker Friedhof, Freiburg, Germany
- Occupation: Writer
- Spouse: Carl-Josef Görres

Philosophical work
- Main interests: The Catholic Church, sanctity, saints
- Notable works: The Hidden Face: A Study of St. Thérèse of Lisieux / Bread Grows in Winter / The Church in the Flesh /
- Website: idagoerres.org

Ida Friederike Görres (born Elisabeth Friederike, Reichsgräfin von Coudenhove-Kalergi; 2 December 1901 in Schloss Ronsperg, Bohemia – 15 May 1971 in Frankfurt am Main) was a Catholic writer. From the Coudenhove-Kalergi family, she was the daughter, one of the seven children, of Count Heinrich von Coudenhove-Kalergi and his Japanese wife Mitsuko Aoyama. Bishop Erik Varden described her as "one of the seminal Catholic thinkers of the twentieth century."

== Biography ==
=== Early life ===
Ida Friederike Görres was born on 2 December 1901 in western Bohemia on her family's estate in Ronsperg (today Poběžovice), where she grew up. She was the sixth of seven children, and her siblings included Richard Nikolaus Graf von Coudenhove-Kalergi, Gerolf Joseph Benedikt Maria Valentin Franz Coudenhove-Kalergi, and Elisabeth Maria Anna Coudenhove-Kalergi.

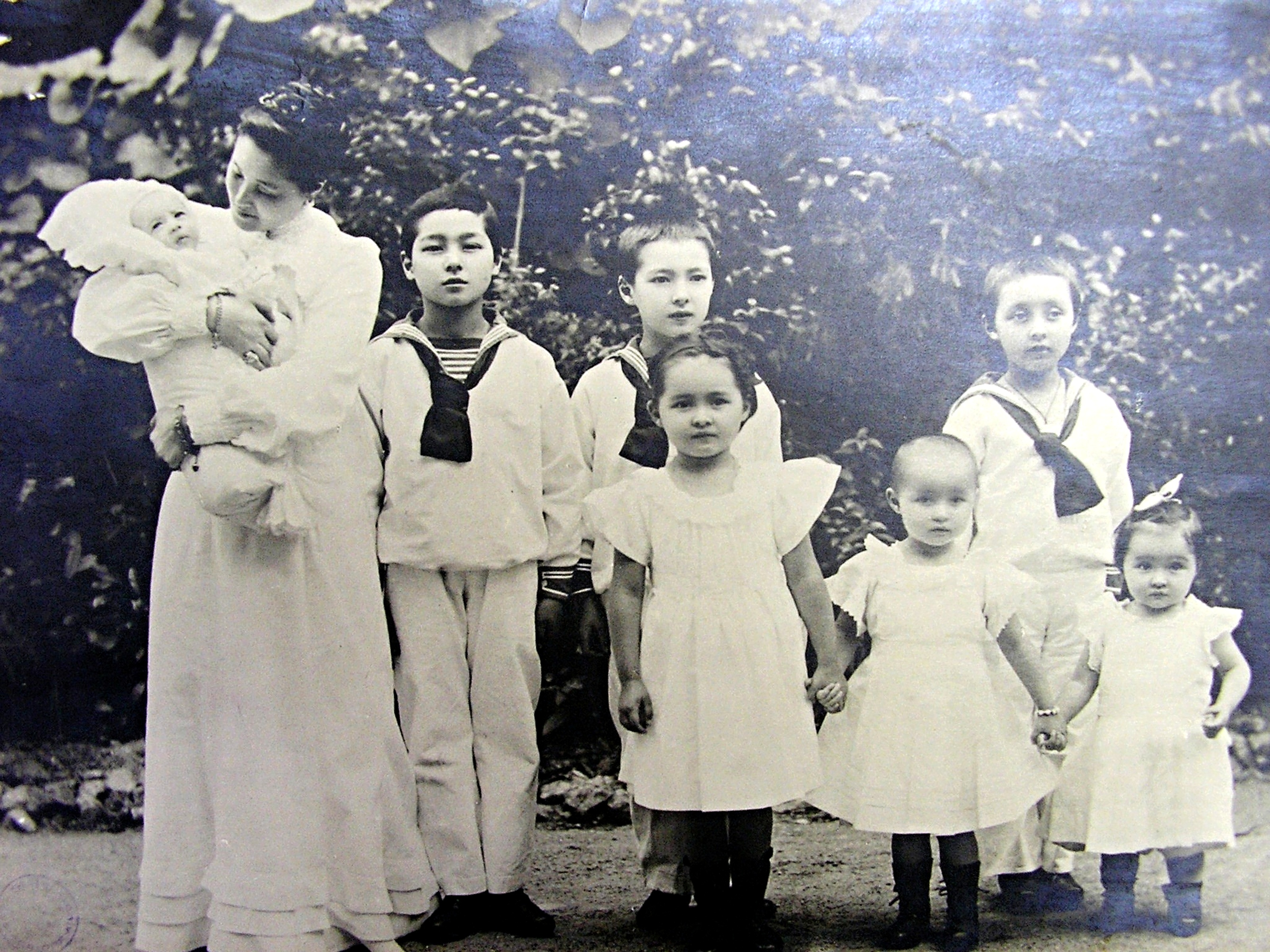
Mitsuko von Coudenhove-Kalergi at the family estate in Ronsperg (today Poběžovice) with her seven children. Young Ida is on the far right.

=== Education and work ===
Görres attended Austrian convent schools, first at the College of the Sacred Heart in Pressbaum near Vienna and then with the Mary Ward Sisters in St. Pölten. In 1923, she entered a novitiate at the Mary Ward Institute in St. Pölten but left the convent in 1925. After that, she studied political science in Vienna from 1925 to 1927, and then other topics such as the social sciences, history, church history, theology and philosophy from 1927 to 1929 in Freiburg.

She became involved in the German Catholic Youth Movement around 1925, acting as the federal leader of the girls and writing articles for the magazine Die Schildgenossen. Together with Walter Dirks and Ludwig Neundörfer, she headed the "Oktoberkreis" founded in 1930. Then in 1931, she went to Dresden as a youth secretary for girls' pastoral care and worked there at the Catholic Educational Institute. In the spring of 1934 she became diocesan secretary at the ordinariate of the Diocese of Meissen.

Around this time, Ida met engineer Carl-Josef Görres (1903-1973), who was the older brother of Catholic psychologist Albert Görres and so brother-in-law of Silvia Görres (née Volkart). On Easter day (21 April) 1935, Ida and Carl-Josef married at the Oratory in Leipzig. Some time after the ceremony, the couple moved to Stuttgart-Degerloch. Through his work as an engineer and business consultant, Carl-Josef Görres made it possible for Ida to have the opportunity to work as a writer and theologian.

Görres was active as a writer and wrote on various topics on hagiography, stressing the importance of the "humanness of saints." During the last three or four years of World War II, her books were not allowed to be sold in Germany. After the war was over, she continued to write, travel, and lecture, until in 1950 a breakdown in health drove her into seclusion. Her frank 1946 "Letter on the Church" unleashed significant controversy, though it is now viewed in hindsight as prescient. Her collection of personal writings, Broken Lights, Diaries and Letters 1951-1959, documents her work from this time.

She was loyal to the tradition of Catholic Christianity: "I have known no other father but these fathers, the priests of the Church, no brothers but my own dear brothers, the theology students," she said. "No mother but the Church...I loved them all and clung to them, not only as a daughter and sister, but as a Japanese daughter and sister, in the intensity of unconditional submission which belongs to Japanese filial piety."

=== Reception ===
On February 21, 1969, the Catholic philosopher Josef Pieper wrote to Hans Urs von Balthasar, “Do you know the heartfelt essay by Ida Fr. Görres on The Spirituality of Studying Theology...; I wish it were in the hands of every student of theology, especially ‘lay’ theologians.”

=== Friendships ===
Görres's friends included Werner Bergengruen, Maria Birgitta zu Münster, OSB, Erik von Kuehnelt-Leddihn, Walter Nigg, Alfons Rosenberg, and Gustav Siewerth. Also, Görres influenced and was friends with Church historian and Catholic intellectual Donald Nicholl.

=== Death ===
Görres participated in the Würzburg synod and died a day after collapsing following an impassioned speech at a synod meeting in Frankfurt. At the Requiem held in Freiburg Cathedral, the eulogy was delivered by Fr. Joseph Ratzinger, who later became Pope Benedict XVI.

== Works ==
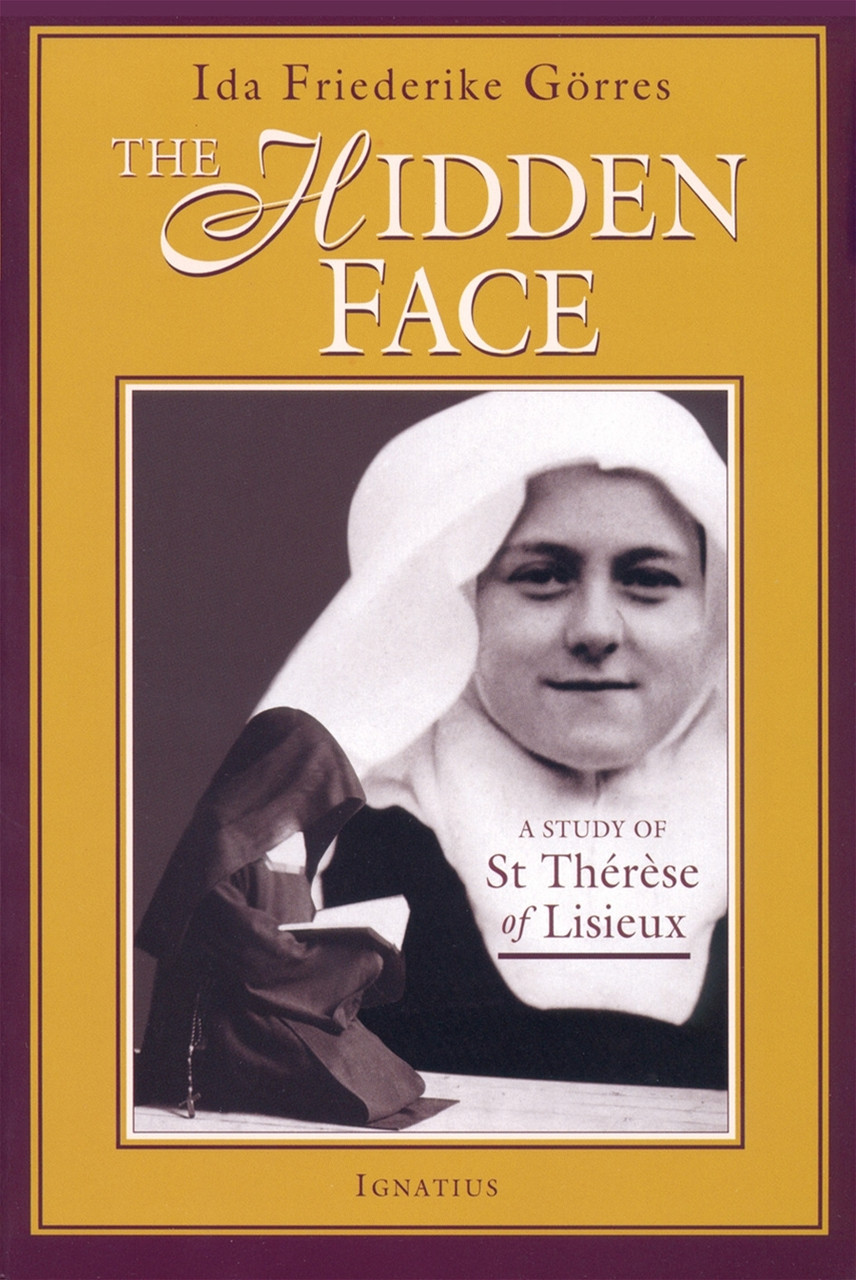
The cover of the reissue of The Hidden Face (Ignatius Press, 2003; translated by Richard and Clara Winston)

=== Books translated into English ===
With the date of translation into English in parentheses.

- The Nature of Sanctity: A Dialogue (1932). After this was published in English in 1932, Christopher Dawson and T. F. Burns included The Nature of Sanctity in the series The Persistence of Order.
- Bread Grows in Winter (2025)
- The Burden of Belief (1934)
- The Cloister and the World (1935)
- Mary Ward (1939)
- The Hidden Face: A Study of St. Thérèse of Lisieux (1959; Ignatius Press 2003)
- Broken Lights: Diaries and Letters, 1951-1959 (1964)
- Is Celibacy Outdated? (1965)
- The Church in the Flesh (2023)
- John Henry Newman: A Life Sacrificed (2024)

=== Quartet: The Christian Life ===
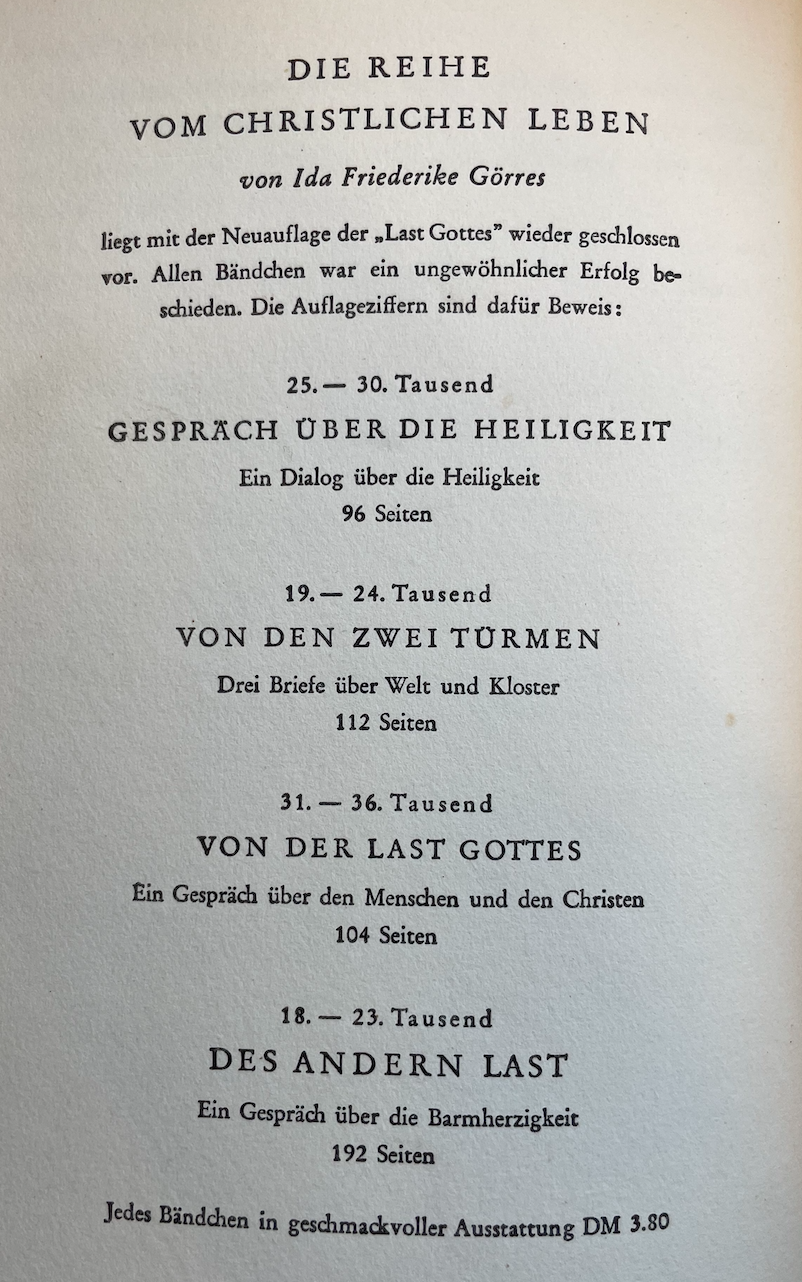
The four-part series on The Christian Life by Ida Görres. From 1950 edition of Von der Last Gottes (The Burden of Belief).

Her first three books translated into English in the 1930s are part of a series of four books Görres published about key aspects of Catholic life and the Catholic faith. Part one is The Nature of Sanctity. Part two is The Burden of Belief on the Catholic faith in the modern world. The Nature of Sanctity and The Burden of Belief are both written in the form of a dialogue. Part three, The Cloister and the World, is about discerning one's vocation in life; Görres wrote this one in the form of fictional letters to young women. The fourth book in this series, on the nature of mercy, has not yet been translated into English.

=== Essays translated into English ===
- "Laywoman's View of Priestly Celibacy" (1966)
- "A Letter on the Church" (Dublin Review, 1949, adapted/translated by Ida Friederike Görres)
- "Of the Homelessness of God" (1949)
- "St. Joan" (1949) (initially published as "The Saint Who Took the World Seriously" in The Cloister and the World)
- "Trusting the Church: A Lecture" (1970, translated by Jennifer S. Bryson; also available as audio recording by Karina Majewski)
- "When Does a Person Have a Capacity for Liturgy?" (1966, translated by Jennifer S. Bryson)
- "The Wild Orchid and Christendom in the Novels of Sigrid Undset (1930)," (translated by Jennifer S. Bryson)
- "Satanic," "An Atheistic Doctrine of Woman": A Review of Simone de Beauvoir's The Second Sex (1951; translated by Jan C. Bentz and Jennifer Sue Bryson).
- "Women in Holy Orders?" (UK) / "Women As Priests? This Woman Says 'No'." (USA; 1965)

=== Books in German (partial list) ===
- Gespräch über die Heiligkeit (1931)
- Von Ehe und von Einsamkeit (1949)
- Der Geopferte: ein anderer Blick auf John Henry Newman, edited by Hanna-Barbara Gerl-Falkovitz (2011, published posthumously)
- Im Winter wächst das Brot (1970)
- Die leibhaftige Kirche (1950)
- Das Verborgene Antlitz: Eine Studie über Therese von Lisieux (1944)
- Was Ehe auf immer bindet (1971)
- "Wirklich die neue Phönixgestalt?" Über Kirche und Konzil; Unbekannte Briefe 1962-1971 von Ida Friederike Görres an Paulus Gordan, edited by Hanna-Barbara Gerl-Falkovitz (2015)

== Legacy ==
Görres is best known in the English speaking world for her 1944 study of Thérèse of Lisieux, Das Verborgene Antlitz - translated as The Hidden Face. The British cookery writer and celebrity chef Delia Smith named the book as an influence on her Roman Catholicism.

Since 2020, there has been renewed interest among English-speaking Catholics in the work of Görres. There have been new translations of her works into English by Jennifer S. Bryson. Others are drawing on her work for topics relevant today, such as an article in 2024 by Canadian John Paul Gamage on Görres's insights into the importance of celibacy for the Catholic priesthood.
