= Gerald Vann =

British Roman Catholic theologian and philosopher

Laurence Samuel Gerald Vann, O.P. (24 August 1906 - 14 July 1963) was a British Catholic theologian and philosopher. He was a member of the Dominican Order.

== Biography ==
Vann was born in St Mary Cray, Kent. He joined the Dominican Order in 1923 and was ordained a priest in 1929. He obtained a doctorate in Sacred Theology from the Collegio Angelico, the future Pontifical University of Saint Thomas Aquinas in Rome in 1931.

Vann's books include works on just war theory and Thomas Aquinas. In 1935, he wrote an Introduction to the English translation of the book The Burden of Belief by Ida Coudenhove.

Vann died in Newcastle-upon-Tyne in 1963 after a long illness.

== Works ==
- On Being Human (1933)
- Morals Makyth Man (1937) (repr. as Morals and Man, 1960)
- Morality and War (1939)
- Of His Fullness (1939)
- Saint Thomas Aquinas (1940) (repr. as The Aquinas Prescription, 2000)
- The Heart of Man (1944)
- The Divine Pity (1945) (repr. as The Seven Sweet Blessings of Christ, 1997)
- Eve and the Gryphon (1946) (repr. as Heart of Compassion, 1998)
- His Will is our Peace (1947)
- The Pain of Christ and the Sorrow of God (1947)
- Awake in Heaven (1948)
- The Two Trees (1948)
- The Seven Swords (1950) (repr. as At the Foot of the Cross, 1998, and as Mary's Answer for Our Troubled Times, 2001)
- The High Green Hill (1951)
- The Wisdom of Boethius (1950)
- The Water and the Fire (1953)
- Stones or Bread? (1957) (co-author with P. K. Meagher; repr. as The Temptations of Christ, 1966, and as The Devil and How to Resist Him, 1997)
- The Paradise Tree (1959)
- The Son's Course (1959)
- Blackfriars School, 1659-1959 (1959)
- To Heaven with Diana (1960)
- The Eagle's Word: A Presentation of the Gospel according to St. John (1961)
- The Missal Step by Step (with D. A. Young and P. Quail, illustrator, 1963)
- Moral Dilemmas (1963)
