= Innerste Uplands =

Coordinates: 52°01′N 10°07′E

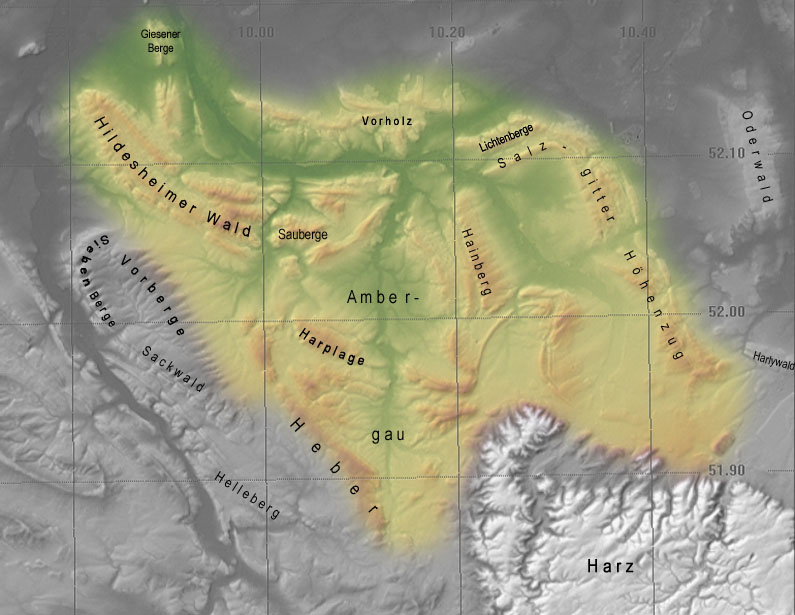
Topographic map of the Innerstebergland (terrain only)

The Innerste Uplands (German: Innerstebergland) is a landscape region up to 359 m high and covering an area of over 900 km² in the northern part of the German Central Uplands. It lies within the eastern part of the Weser-Leine Uplands in Lower Saxony (Germany).

The Innerste Uplands gets its name from the Innerste, a tributary of the River Leine.

== Geography ==
=== Location ===
The Innerste Uplands cover the catchment area of the Innerste southeast of Hildesheim and southwest to south of Salzgitter as far as Goslar and Seesen on the northwestern edge of the Harz. To the north the area is bounded by the Hildesheim Börde, to the west by the Leine Uplands and to the southeast by the North Harz Foreland. Its central and southern areas are dominated by the Ambergau, a depression dissected by the Nette, a tributary of the Innerste.

In and around the Innerste Uplands there are the following clearly defined ridges, most of which are cuestas and some of which lie on the boundary with neighbouring landscape regions (listed in alphabetical order): Giesen Hills, Hainberg, Harplage, Heber, Hildesheim Forest, Salzgitter Ridge (including the Lichtenberge), Sauberge and Vorholz. Between these ridges run the following rivers: Innerste, Lamme, Neile and Nette together with their tributaries.

=== Description ===
The ridges of the Innerste Uplands are predominantly covered with deciduous forest, particularly beech woods. The rivers run through gently rolling depressions, covered with a thick layer of loess; this includes the basin of the Ambergau. The fertile soils are heavily used for arable farming. Also part of the landscape are quarries or open-cast mines, nowadays largely closed and sometimes filled with water, in which Keuper sandstone was extracted during the Middle Ages.

=== Hills and mountains ===
Eight ridges belong to the Innerste Uplands. They are, in order of height:

- Hildesheim Forest (359 m above NN)
- Salzgitter Hills (322,9 m) including the Lichtenberge (254 m)
- Sauberge (317 m)
- Heber (314 m)
- Hainberg (299 m)
- Harplage (290 m)
- Vorholz (243 m)
- Giesener Berge (162,6 m)

The highest elevation in the Innerste Uplands is the 359 m high Griesberg in the Hildesheim Forest.

=== Rivers ===
The rivers of the Innerste Uplands are:

- Alme - in the west, of the Riehe
- Beuster - in the northwest, tributary of the Innerste
- Innerste - in the north, northeast and east, tributary of the Leine
- Lamme - in the west, tributary of the Innerste
- Neile - in the central southeast, tributary of the Innerste
- Nette - in the centre (Ambergau), tributary of the Innerste
- Riehe - in the west, tributary of the Lamme

=== Towns and villages ===
The following towns and villages lie within the Innerste Uplands or around its edge:

- Adenstedt
- Almstedt
- Baddeckenstedt
- Bad Salzdetfurth
- Bockenem
- Goslar
- Hildesheim
- Holle
- Langelsheim
- Lamspringe
- Lutter am Barenberge
- Salzgitter
