= Sauberge =

Highest point
- Peak: Hammerstein's Höhe
- Elevation: 317 m (1,040 ft)

Geography
- Country: Germany
- State: Lower Saxony
- District: Hildesheim
- Range coordinates: 51°3.5′N 10°2′E
- Parent range: Innerste Uplands

The Sauberge is a hill range up to 317 m above sea level (NN) in the Innerste Uplands in the district of Hildesheim in eastern Lower Saxony in Germany.

== Geography ==
=== Location ===
The wooded Sauberge is located in the centre of the northern part of the Innerste Uplands, a northeastern part of the Lower Saxon Hills, and borders on the historic Ambergau region. The hills extend east of the Hildesheim Forest, from Bad Salzdetfurth and the narrow valley of the Lamme to Derneburg. Hackenstedt is located in a broad valley east of the Bünte. A few kilometres east-northeast lies Holle and some distance away to the south-east is Bockenem; a few individual districts of these town boroughs reach as far as the ridge. One kilometre to the north a stretch of the Innerste river flows past the Sauberge in an east-west direction. To the east the Nette runs past the hills from south to north. A few miles north-northeast is the ridge of Vorholz.

=== Hills ===
The hills of the Sauberge range include the following (heights in metres above NN):

- Hammersteins Höhe (ca. 317 m), near Bad Salzdetfurth
- Turmberg (293 m), near Weseln
- Reesberg (281.0 m), near Nette and Upstedt; with a transmission tower
- Breitenberg (280 m), near Hackenstedt
- Feldberg (266 m), near Hackenstedt
- Ziegenberg (257.4 m), near Bad Salzdetfurth; with a transmission tower
- Buchberg (256 m), near Henneckenrode
- Salzberg (257.0 m), near Bad Salzdetfurth
- Ebersberg (266.0 m), near Nette and Upstedt
- Weißer Stein (244.0 m), near Bad Salzdetfurth
- Sothenberg (235.0 m), near Bad Salzdetfurth
- Kanzelberg (208 m), near Hackenstedt
- Westberg (208 m), near Derneburg
- Egge (187 m), near Klein Düngen

=== Towns and villages ===
The territories of the following towns and villages lie in and next to the Sauberge (in alphabetical order):

- Bad Salzdetfurth to the west
- Bockenem to the southeast
- Holle to the northeast

== Description ==
The Sauberge, which reach their highest point at Hammerstein's Höhe (317 m above NN) and are the source of several tributary streams for the river Lamme, are crisscrossed by numerous trails and forest tracks; but there are no roads across the unpopulated ridge. Part of the B 243 federal road cuts through the middle of the hills, running between the villages of Wesseln and Nette. There is an eighteen-hole golf course on the northern slope of Hammerstein's Höhe. Access to the hills is restricted by a hunting preserve, where a herd of fallow deer is kept. The wild boar population is relatively large. Amongst the most important species of bird are the middle and lesser spotted woodpeckers, the European green woodpecker and the grey-headed woodpecker. A high density of breeding red kites live around the edges of the forest, especially in the east and south. Buzzard, goshawk, sparrowhawk and hobby also breed here. Amongst the more numerous songbirds are firecrest, crested tit, wood warbler, tree pipit and common crossbill.
