= Hainberg (hills) =

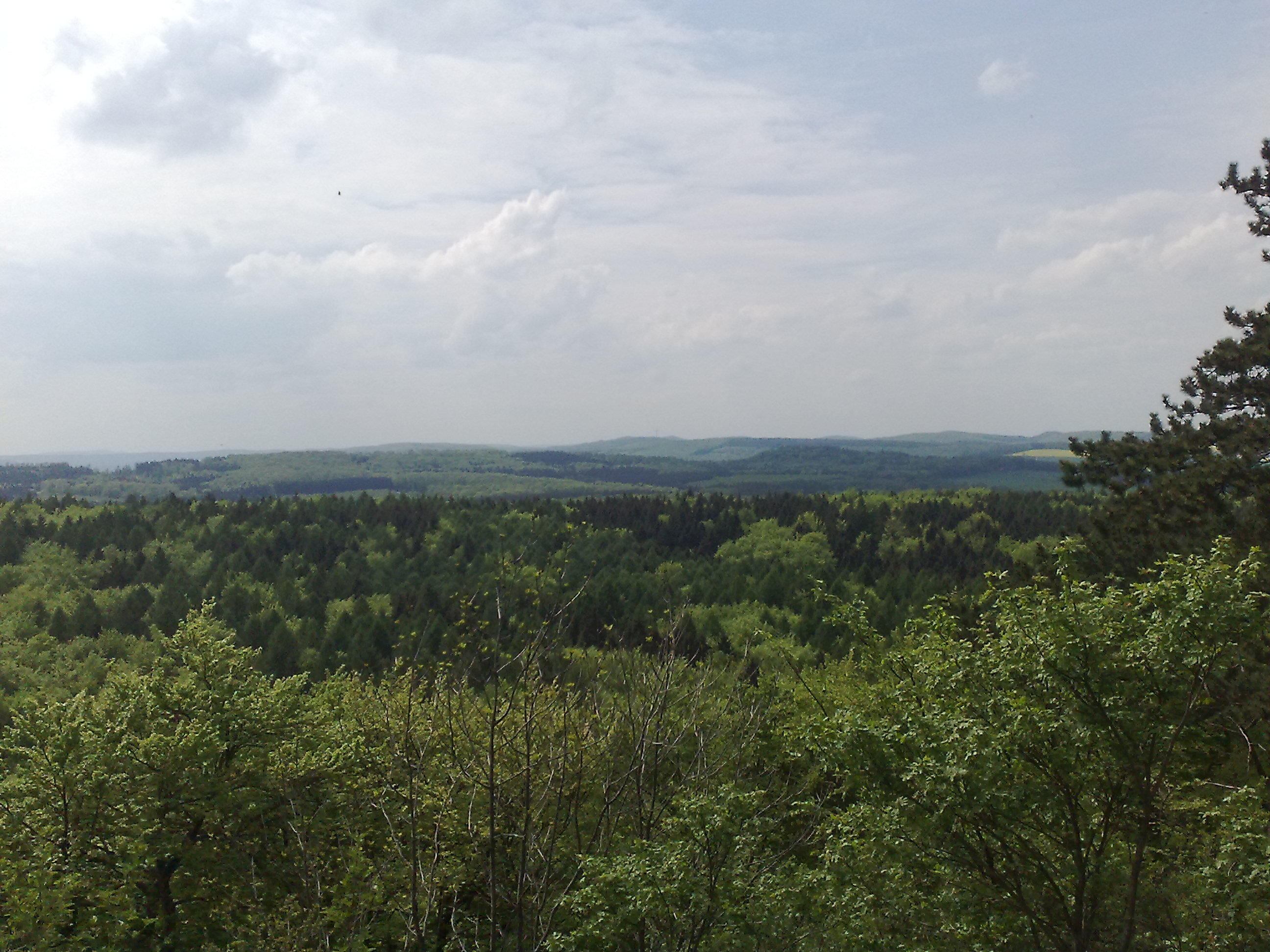
- View from the mountain Nördlicher Jägerturmskopf over the Hainberg

Highest point
- Peak: Kalter Buschkopf
- Elevation: 299 m (981 ft)

Dimensions
- Length: 15 km (9.3 mi)

Geography
- Country: Germany
- State: Lower Saxony
- Range coordinates: 52°02′00″N 10°12′00″E
- Parent range: Lower Saxon Hills

The Hainberg (known locally as the Hainberge as it has several summits. Also the old form Heinberg) is a hill range, up to 299 metres high, northwest of the Harz Mountains in the eastern part of Lower Saxony, Germany.

== Geography ==
The heavily wooded Hainberg runs along the boundary of the counties of Wolfenbüttel, Goslar and Hildesheim. It is located in the centre of the im Zentrum des Innerste Uplands, a northeastern section of the Lower Saxon Hills, several kilometres southwest of the town of Salzgitter and borders on the Ambergau to the east. The ridge is west of the River Innerste, northwest of the Neile and east of the Nette between the ridges of Vorholz to the north-northwest and the Salzgitter Ridge (including the Lichtenbergen) to the north, northeast and east. South of the Hainberg are the northwestern fringes of the Harz Mountains. The Hainberg runs from Holle in the north-northwest and Baddeckenstedt to the north Norden and east to Lutter am Barenberge in the south. To the west of the Hainberg lies Bockenem in the middle of the Ambergau.

A section of the A 7 motorway runs in a north-south direction through the northwestern part of the Hainberg and part of the B 6 federal road runs past to the northeast. To the southeast the B 248 grazes the hills.

== Description ==
The Hainberg is up to 299 metres high at the Kalter Buschkopf. Several tributary streams of the Innerste and Nette rise on its slopes and it is crossed by several hiking trails and forest tracks.

Among the sights of the Hainberg are the Bodensteiner Klippen (ca. 200 to 283 m above sea level (NN)), which are made of sandstone and run for about 3 km through the southern part of the Hainberg. To the north of those crags is St. Hubert's Grotto. There is a viewing tower, the Jägerturm ("Hunter's Tower") on the Northern Jägertumskopf (244 m), from which there are views of the Harz to the south. Also worth visiting is Wohldenberg Castle, which stands on the Wohldenberg (218 m) in the northwest of the hills. There are good views from the bergfried.

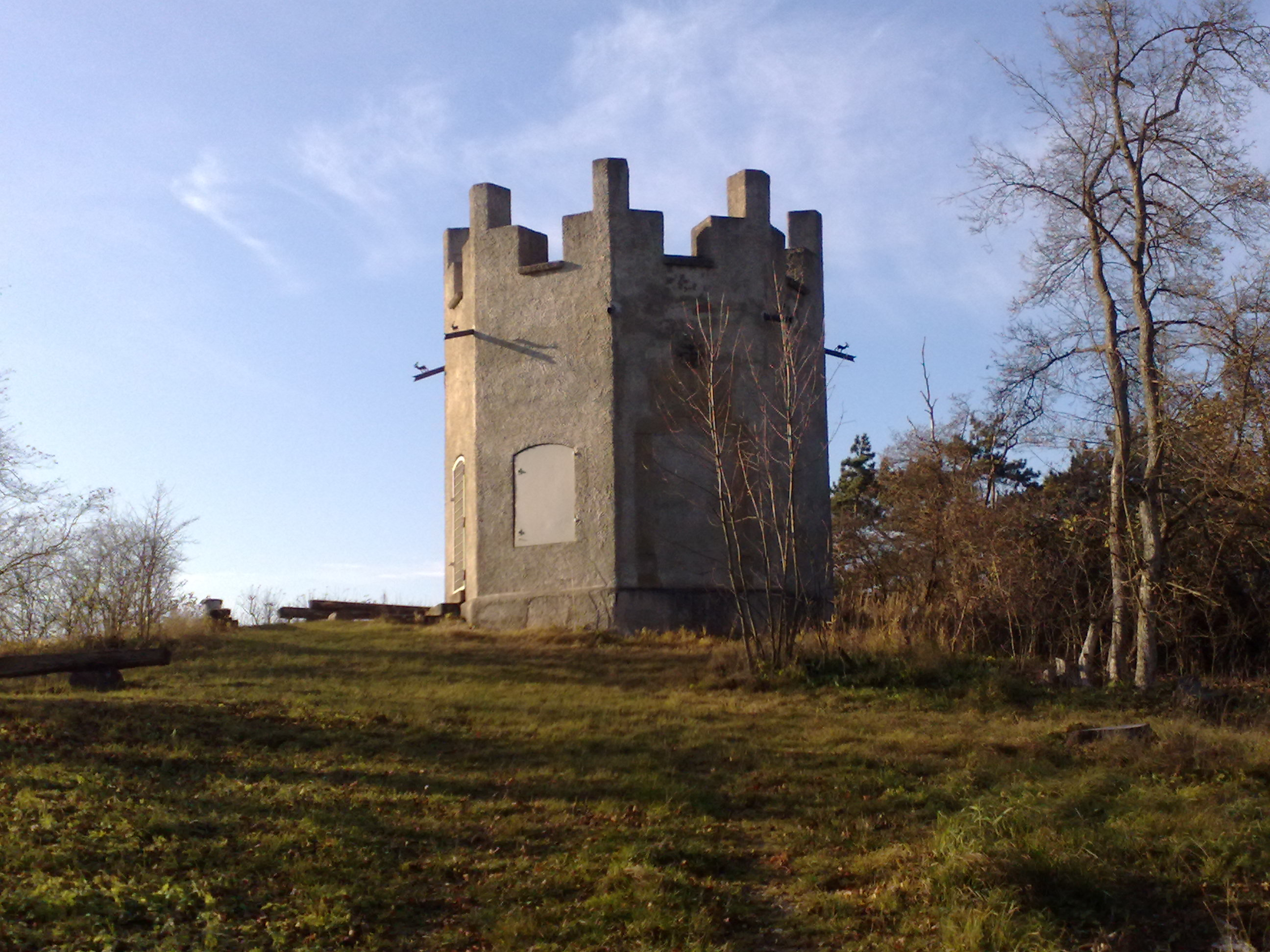
Jägerturm tower

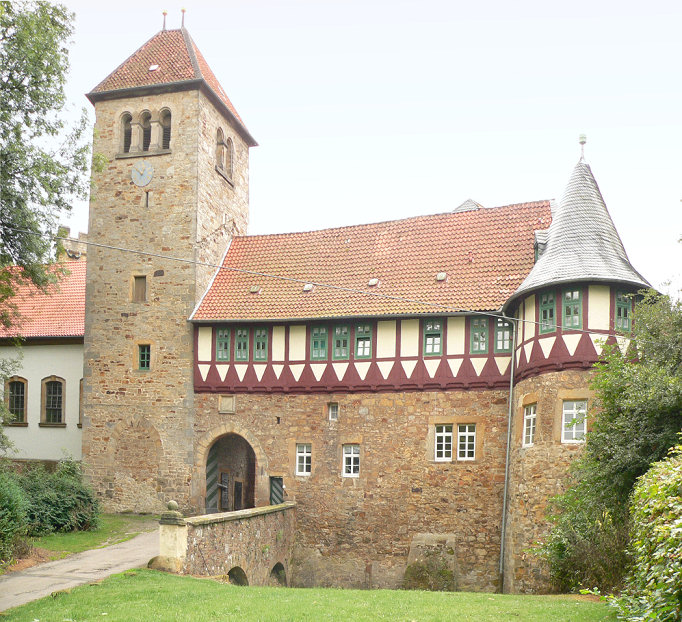
Wohldenberg Castle

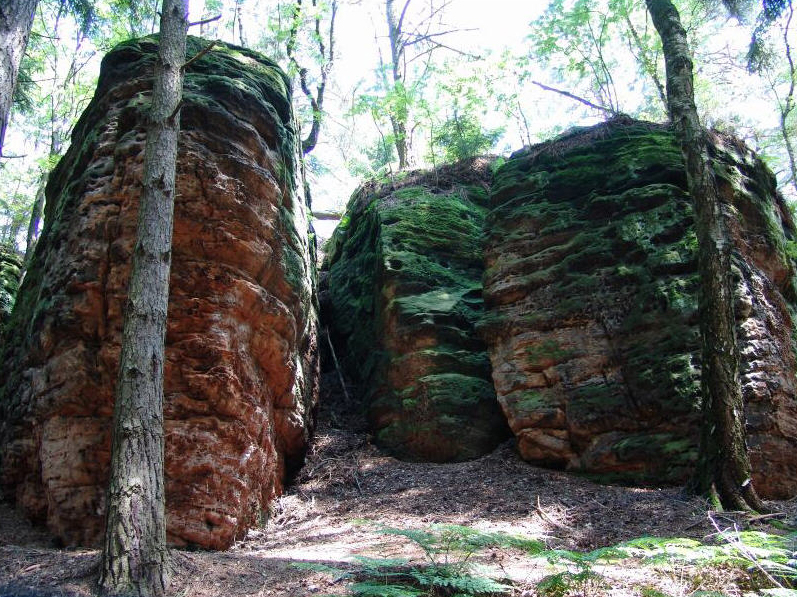
Part of the Bodenstein Crags

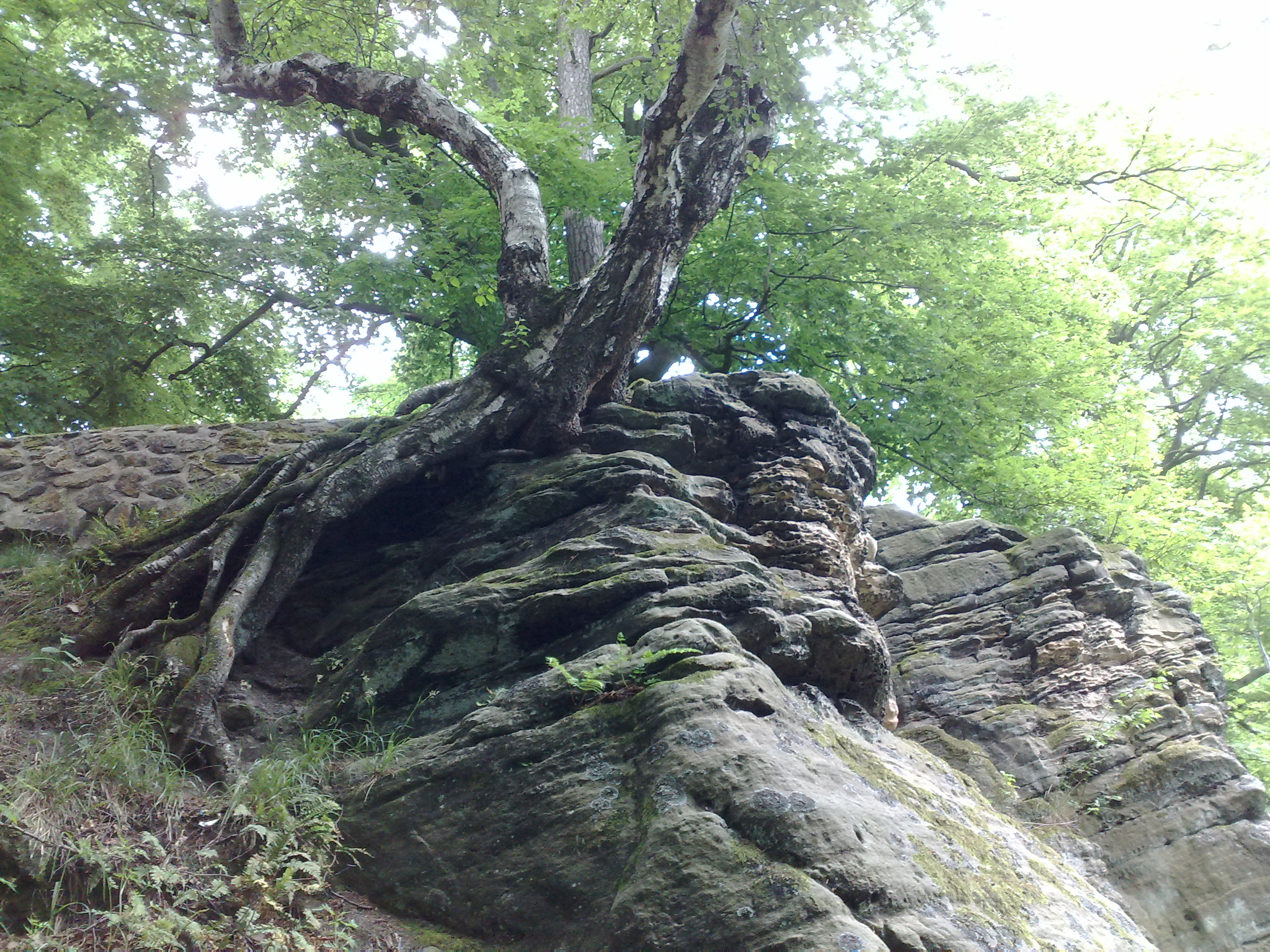
Rock formation at the Jägerhaus above St Hubert's Chapel (and St. Hubert's Grotto)

== Hills ==
Amongst the hills in the Hainberg are the following:

- Kalter Buschkopf (299 m above sea level (NN))
- Schlahköpfe (285 m)
- Steinberg (283 m; part of the Bodensteiner Klippen)
- Hohlenberg (263 m)
- Bodensteiner Klippen (ca. 200 to 283 m)
- Kliebenkopf (254 m)
- Lauhberg (253 m)
- Jägerturmsköpfe (251 m)
- Northern (Nördlicher) Jägertumskopf (244 m) - with Jägerturm
- Osterklippe (235 m; part of the Bodensteiner Klippen)
- Eichenberg (226 m)
- Papenberg (226 m)
- Hillenberg (224 m)
- Langenberg (224 m)
- Spitzer Hai (222 m)
- Wohldenberg (218 m) - with Wohldenberg Castle
- Kapitelhai (209 m)
- Hützlah (206 m)

== Settlements ==
Settlements in and near the Hainberg are:

- Baddeckenstedt to the north-northeast
- Bockenem to the west
- Sehlde to the east
- Holle to the north-northwest
- Wallmoden to the south
- Heere to the northeast
