= Heber (hills) =

Hill range in Germany

Coordinates: 51°54′N 10°6′E

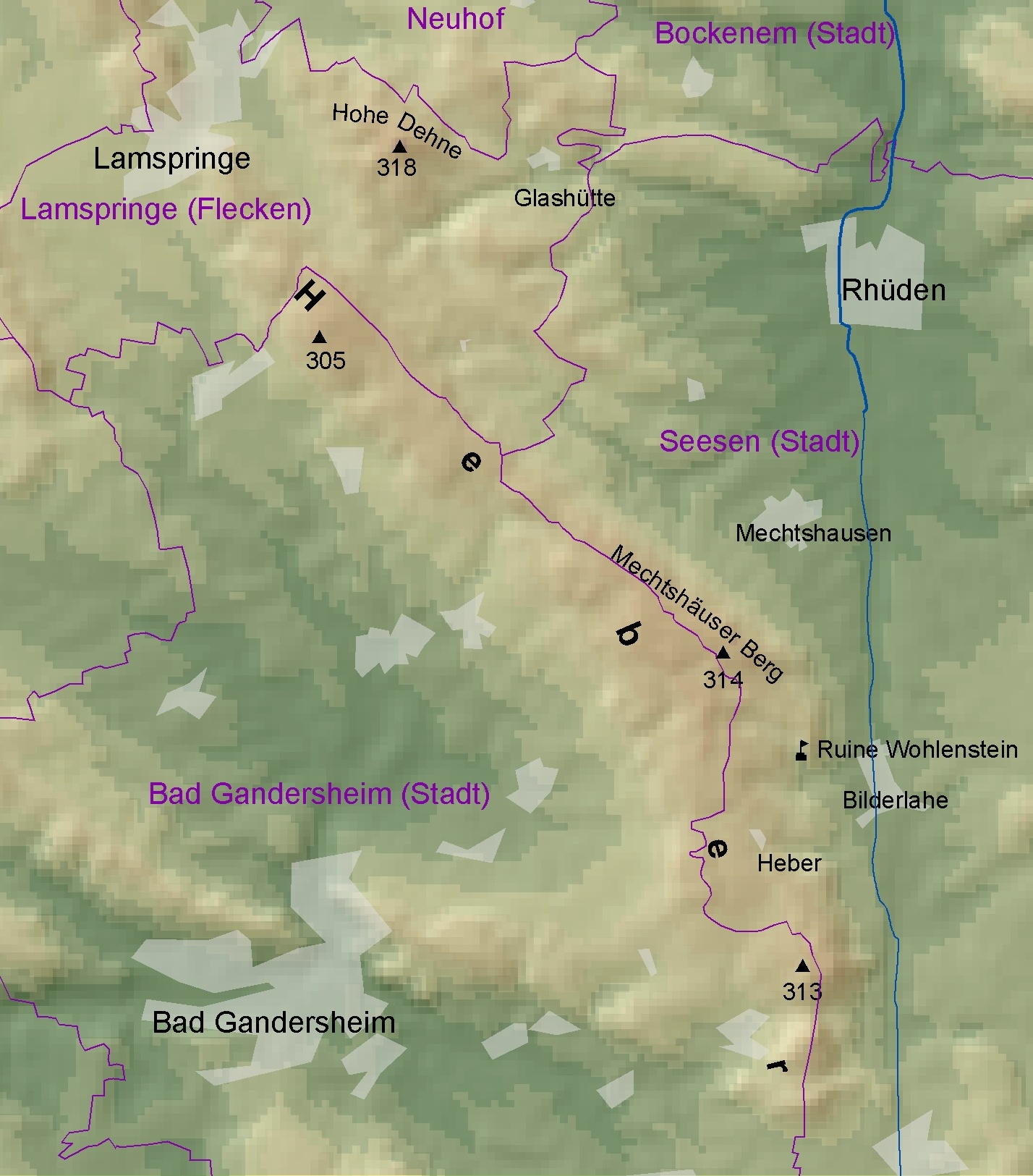
Overview map of the Heber

The Heber is a hogback ridge, relatively small in area and up to 313.5 metres high, in the Lower Saxon Hills within the districts of Goslar, Northeim and Hildesheim in the German state of Lower Saxony.

== Geography ==
The Heber is oriented from northwest to southeast and lies in the southwestern part of the Innerste Uplands, the northeasternmost part of the Lower Saxon Hills where it transitions to the Leine Uplands (Alfeld Uplands). It is located in the western Harz Foreland roughly between Lamspringe by the source region of the River Lamme in the northwest and the town of Seesen on the River Schildau by the Harz Mountains in the southeast. Some distance away to the north are Bockenem on the Nette and Bad Gandersheim on the Gande to the southwest. The Heber region forms part of the districts of Hildesheim (north), Goslar (east) and Northeim (west). To the northeast is the Ambergau (or Bockenem) bowl.

The Heber is surrounded by a number of hill ranges: the Harplage to the north, the foothills of the Harz Mountains to the southeast, the Helleberg to the southwest, the Sackwald to the west, the Vorberge to the northwest and, several kilometres away, the Hildesheim Forest to the northwest. A number of streams rise within and on the edge of the Heber whose waters sooner or later make their way into the northwards-flowing Innerste or the westward-flowing Leine; the ridges thus lies on the watershed between the two rivers. The unpopulated Heber is crossed by hiking trails that enable visitors to explore the densely wooded landscape. The ridge may be accessed from various Landesstraßen and Kreisstraßen, many of them winding, that branch off the 64, 243 and 248 federal roads and from the A 7 motorway and circumnavigate the forest region linking, for example, Lamspringe, Seesen and Bad Gandersheim with one another.

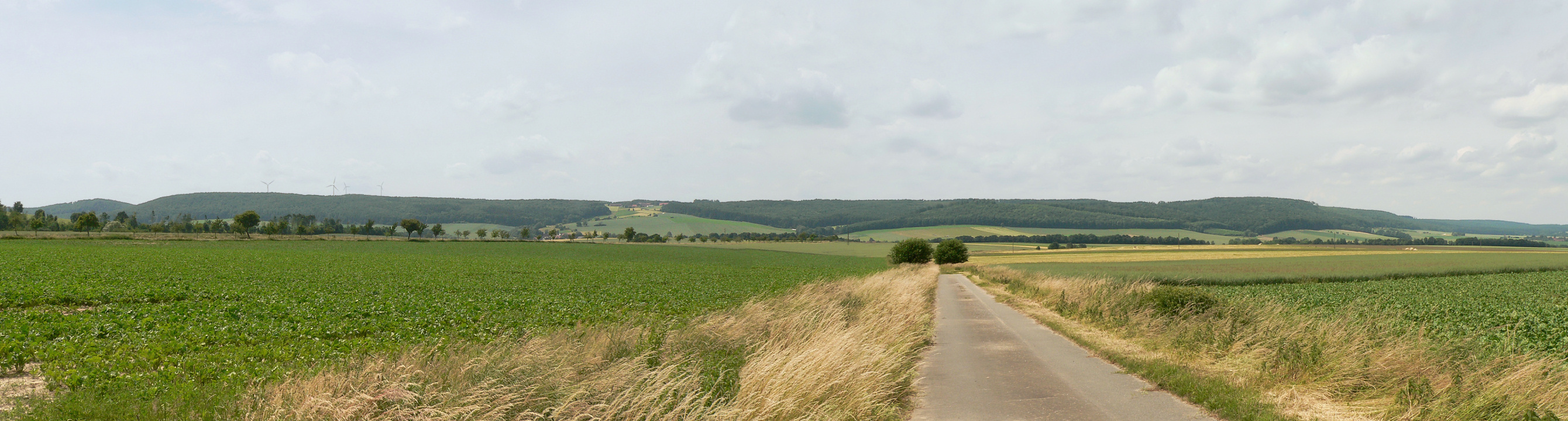
The Heber seen from the east

== Description ==
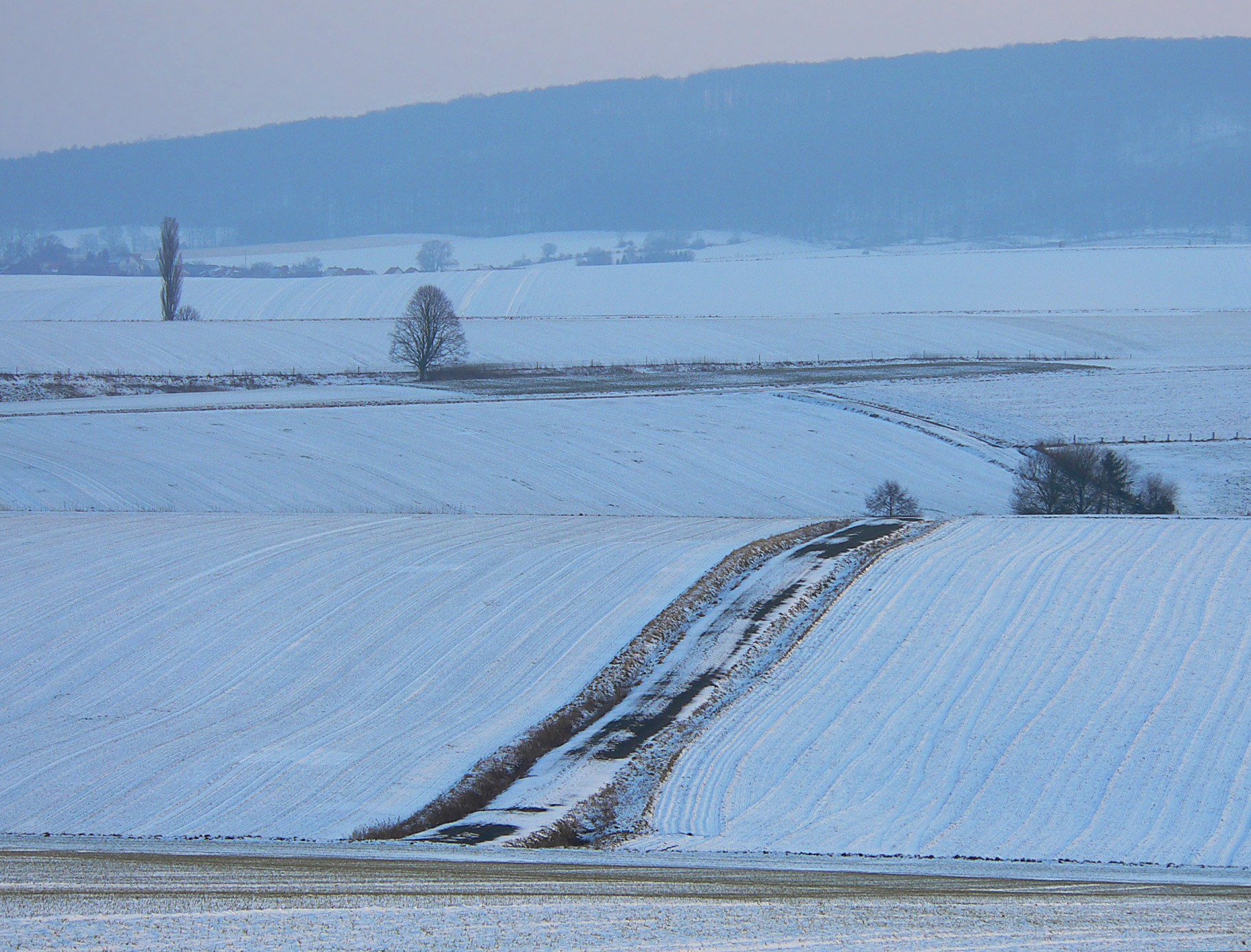
View from Rhüden to the Heber

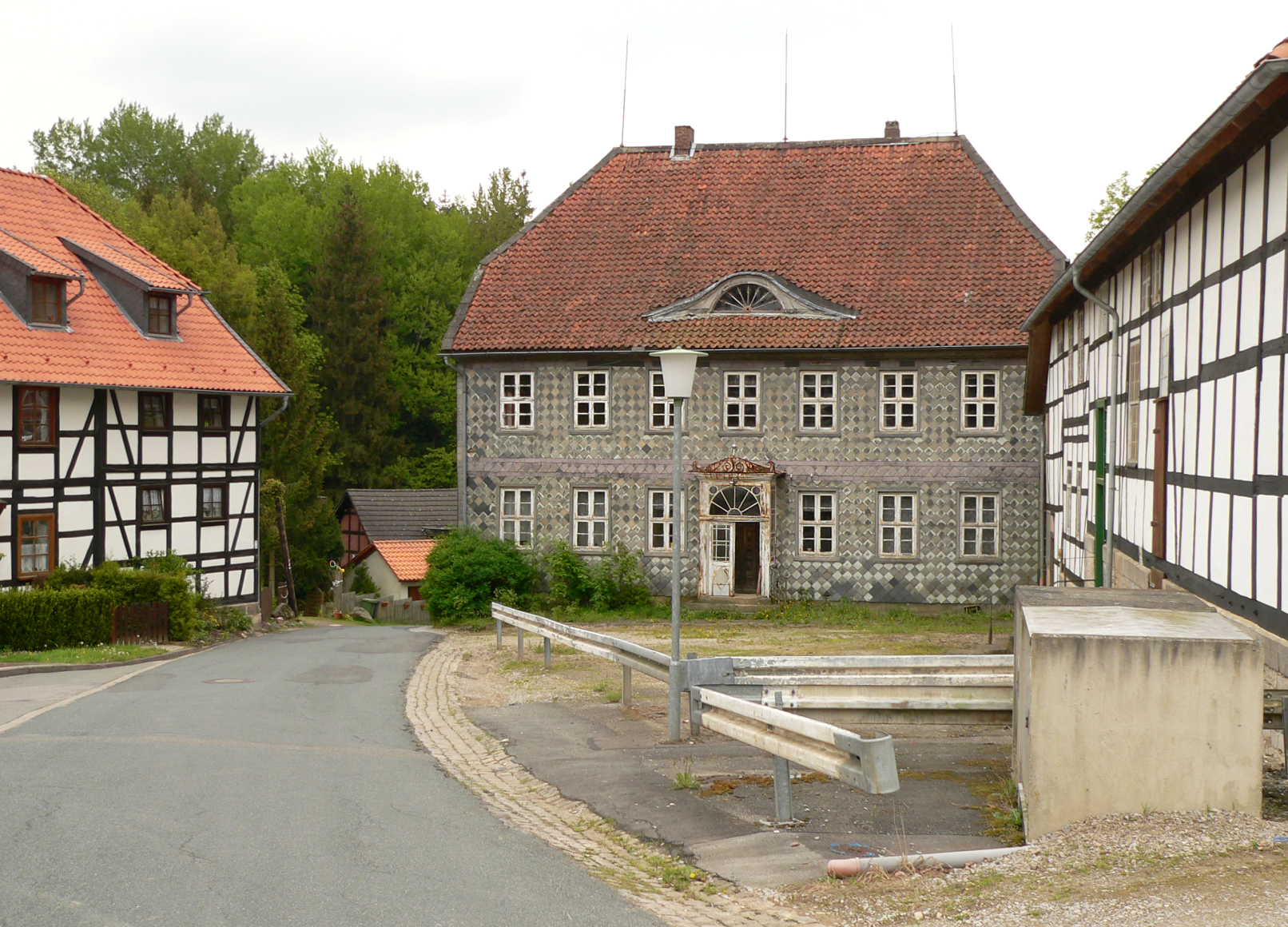
Glassworks in the Westerhof Abbey Forest near the Heber

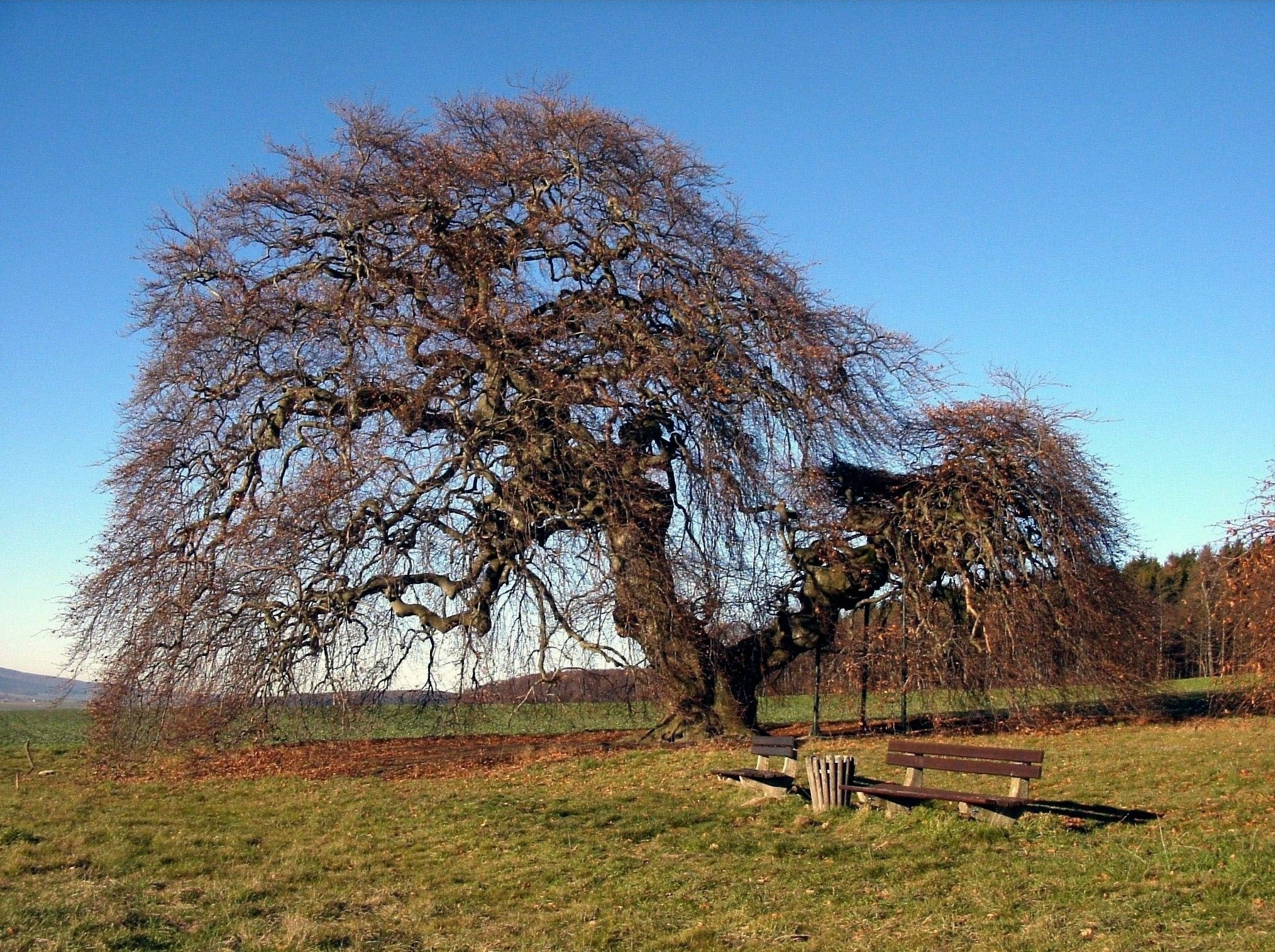
The Kopfbuche beech near Gremsheim

The ridge measures roughly 10 km long by around 1 to 2 km wide and is covered by beech and spruce forests. The highest elevation of the Heber is the Mechtshäuser Berg in the borough of Seesen at 313.5 m above sea level (NN). Geologically it is a hogback formed predominantly from limestone. Southwest of the Heber is the Heber-Börde, a basin-like countryside with fertile loess soils. The K 363 road that crossed the Heber has stretches on both sides of the ridge with a 10% gradient. There are six wind turbines on the Heber.

== Sights ==
Near the little village of Gremsheim stands the biggest dwarf beech in Germany. In the southeast of the Heberwald lies the village of Mechtshausen with the final resting place of the poet, Wilhelm Busch. Also in the south above the village of Bilderlahe stands the ruined Wohlenstein Castle on a cone-shaped outlier of the Heber. From there, there are views over the southern exit to the Ambergau.

Several kilometres west of the Heber, on the old railway line from Kreiensen to Hildesheim for about 12 km, between Lamspringe and Bad Gandersheim, sculptures by international sculptors have been set up which has given the cycleway the name of Sculpture Way (Skulpturenweg).

== Hills ==
The hills in and near the Heber include the:

- Hohe Dehne (317.6 m) – in the abbey forest east of Lamspringe
- Mechtshäuser Berg (313.5 m) – highest hill in the Heber, southwest of Mechtshausen
- Klei (312.9 m) – west of Engelade
- Wausterberg (298 m) – east of Dannhausen
- Clausberg (287 m) – southeast of Lamspringe
- Schwalenberg (277 m) – southeast of Dannhausen
- Heberberg (276.6 m) – immediately southeast of Lamspringe
- Toter Mann (272 m) – southwest of Ammenhausen
- Hoher Hagen (266 m) – south of Glashütte
- Panshäuser Berg (258 m) – west of Rhüden and northwest of Oberpanshausen
- Heberg (225 m) – southwest of Wohlenhausen

== Settlements ==
Amongst the settlements in the area of the Heber are:

- Lamspringe, northwest of the Heber
- Seesen, southeast of the Heber
- Bad Gandersheim, southwest of the Heber

== Sources ==
- Bundesanstalt für Landeskunde und Raumforschung: Geographische Landesaufnahme 1:200,000. Naturräumliche Gliederung Deutschlands. Die naturräumlichen Einheiten auf Blatt 99 Göttingen. Bad Godesberg 1963
