= Harplage =

Hill range in Lower Saxony, Germany

Coordinates: 51°59′N 10°4.5′E

The Harplage is a hill range, up to 290 metres high, located west-northwest of the Harz in the southeast of the German state of Lower Saxony.

== Geography ==
The forested Harplage is located in the district of Hildesheim in the southwestern part of the Innerste Uplands, a northeastern range of the Lower Saxon Hills and borders on the Ambergau to the west. It rises between Bockenem to the east-northeast and Lamspringe to the southwest. The ridge lies east of the valley of the River Lamme and west of the Nette valley between the northern part of the Ambergau to the north, the southern half of the Ambergau to the south-southeast and the ridge of Heber to the south. A few kilometres away is the ridge of Hainberg northeast of the Nette valley and somewhat southeast of this river are the northwestern foothills of the Harz.

The A 7 motorway and the B 243 federal road run past the Harplage a few kilometres to the east.

== Description ==
Several tributary streams of the Lamme and Nette rivers have their sources in the Harplage, which rises to 290 metres. A number of forest tracks and hiking trails cross the unpopulated ridge, but there are no roads through the hills.

Amongst the attractions of the Harplage are the Dillsgraben sinkhole, which by the castle of Dillsburg on its eastern edge northwest of Königsdahlum at an elevation of 179 metres.

== Hills ==
Amongst the hills of the Harplage are the:

- Riesberg (290 m above sea level (NN))
- Haryberg (285 m)
- Eckartsberg (250 m)
- Hachumer Berg (270 m)
- Dahlumer Knick (ca. 260 m)

== Settlements ==
Settlements on the edge of the Harplage are:

- Bockenem to the east-northeast
- Lamspringe to the southwest
