= Ambergau =

Natural region unit in southern Lower Saxony, Germany

Coordinates: 51°58′N 10°08′E

The Ambergau is a historic landscape and natural region unit in the Innerste Uplands in southern Lower Saxony, Germany. It is a basin, about 10 x 10 kilometres across, with 18 settlements (there were 31 in the Middle Ages), the centre and capital of which since the 13th century is the town of Bockenem. The basin, with its fertile agricultural fields, is surrounded by the wooded ridges of Heber, the Harplage, the Weinberg and the Hainberg. The Gau is a cultural landscape that was formed as early as the 8th century.

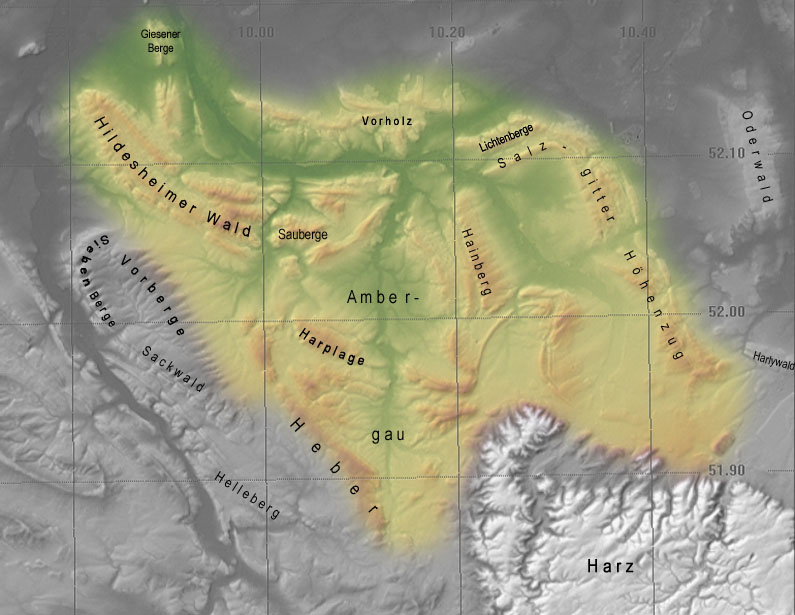
Location of the Ambergau in the Innerste Uplands

== Name ==
The name Ambergau is a combination of the German words Amber and Gau. Amber has its origin in the Proto-Indo-European language and has the word stem mb(h), was means something like dampness. That is probably related to the wet areas that existed at that time, like those of the River Nette. Gau is a word for the enclosed settlement area of Germanic peoples. The term Ambergo was also used.

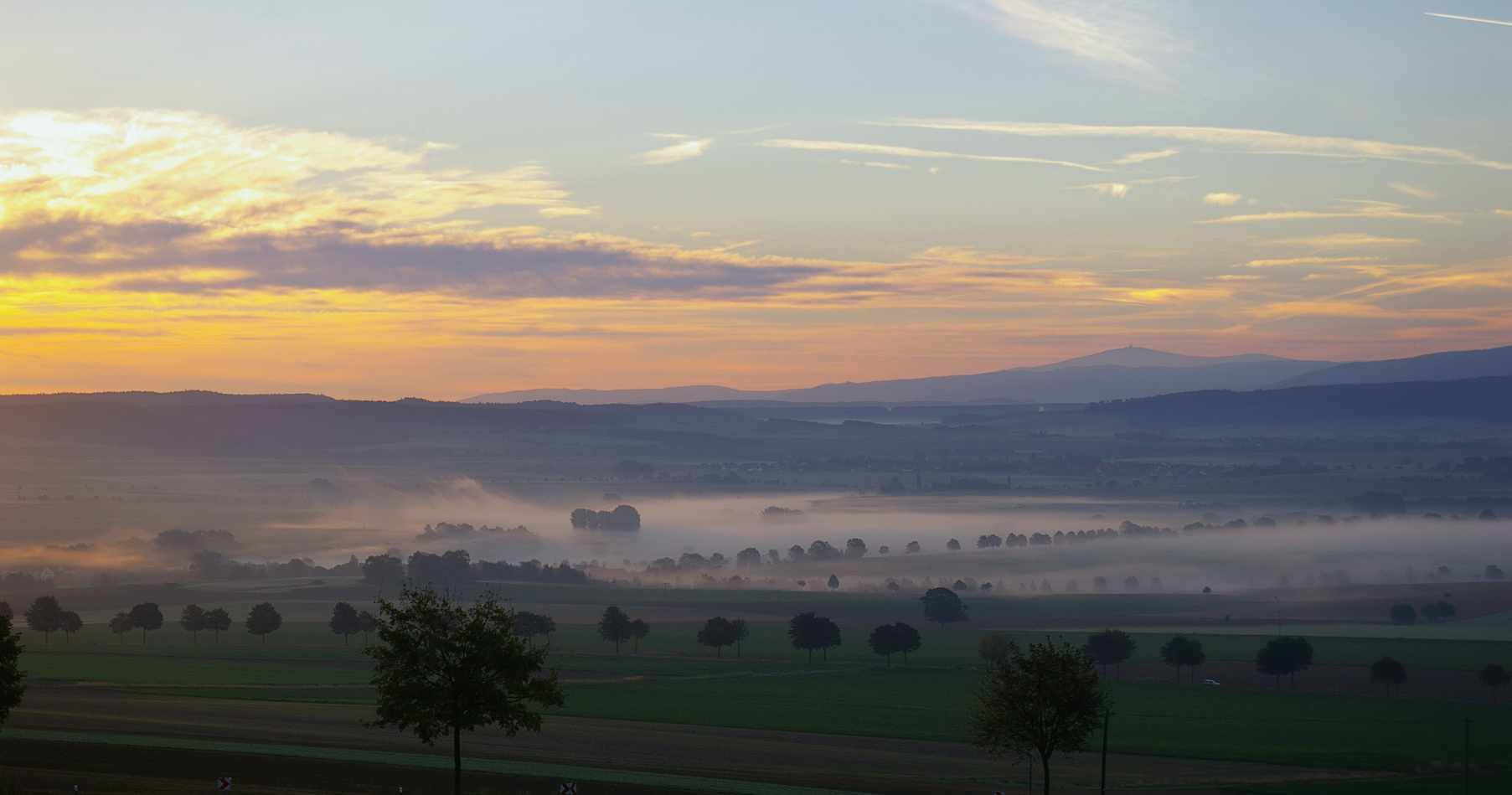
Morning mist in the Ambergau

== Location and land use ==
The Ambergau lies between the northwestern edge of the Harz Mountains and the Hildesheim Börde. The hill ridges surrounding it are predominantly covered by beech woods. The basin-shaped valley is today a largely treeless arable farming region that has probably always been used by man for that purpose. Agriculture was the dominant industry until the 20th century. A moderate degree of industrialization began in 1727 in Bornum with a blast furnace firm. Duke Augustus William of Brunswick-Wolfenbüttel had iron produced in the Wilhelmshütte smeltery.

The Ambergau is bisected from south to north by the River Nette. The bigger lines of communication also run in a north–south direction through the region. These are the goods line from Derneburg to Bornum, the B 243 federal highway and the A 7 motorway.

== Settlement ==
=== Today ===
The 18 present-day settlements in the Ambergau, all within the borough of Bockenem, are:

- Bockenem
- Bönnien
- Bornum
- Bültum
- Groß Ilde
- Hary
- Jerze
- Klein Ilde
- Königsdahlum
- Mahlum
- Nette
- Ortshausen
- Schlewecke
- Störy
- Upstedt
- Volkersheim
- Werder
- Wohlenhausen

=== Middle Ages ===
In addition, during the Middle Ages, there were 13 other settlements in the Ambergau, that were given up during the periods of abandonment (Wüstungsperiode) in the 14th and 15th centuries. These were:

- Bakenrode
- Copstedt
- Dalenhausen
- Hachum
- Hochstedt
- Klein Schlewecke
- Oledorp
- Nienhagen
- Pockenhausen
- Steeme
- Schmachthagen
- Teckenrode
- Tellhausen

== Literature ==
- Friedrich Günther: Der Ambergau. Meyer, Hannover 1887 (Unveränderter Neudruck. Sändig, Walluf bei Wiesbaden 1974, ISBN 3-500-29430-8.
- Manfred Klaube: Der Ambergau. Wirtschafts-, Sozial- und Politikgeschichte. Papierflieger, Clausthal-Zellerfeld 2001, ISBN 3-89720-530-0.
- Manfred Klaube: Kriegs- und Nachkriegsjahre in der Provinz. Bockenem und der Ambergau 1939 bis 1949. Eigenverlag, Bockenem, 2008.
