= Griesberg =

Hill in Hildesheim, Lower Saxony, Germany

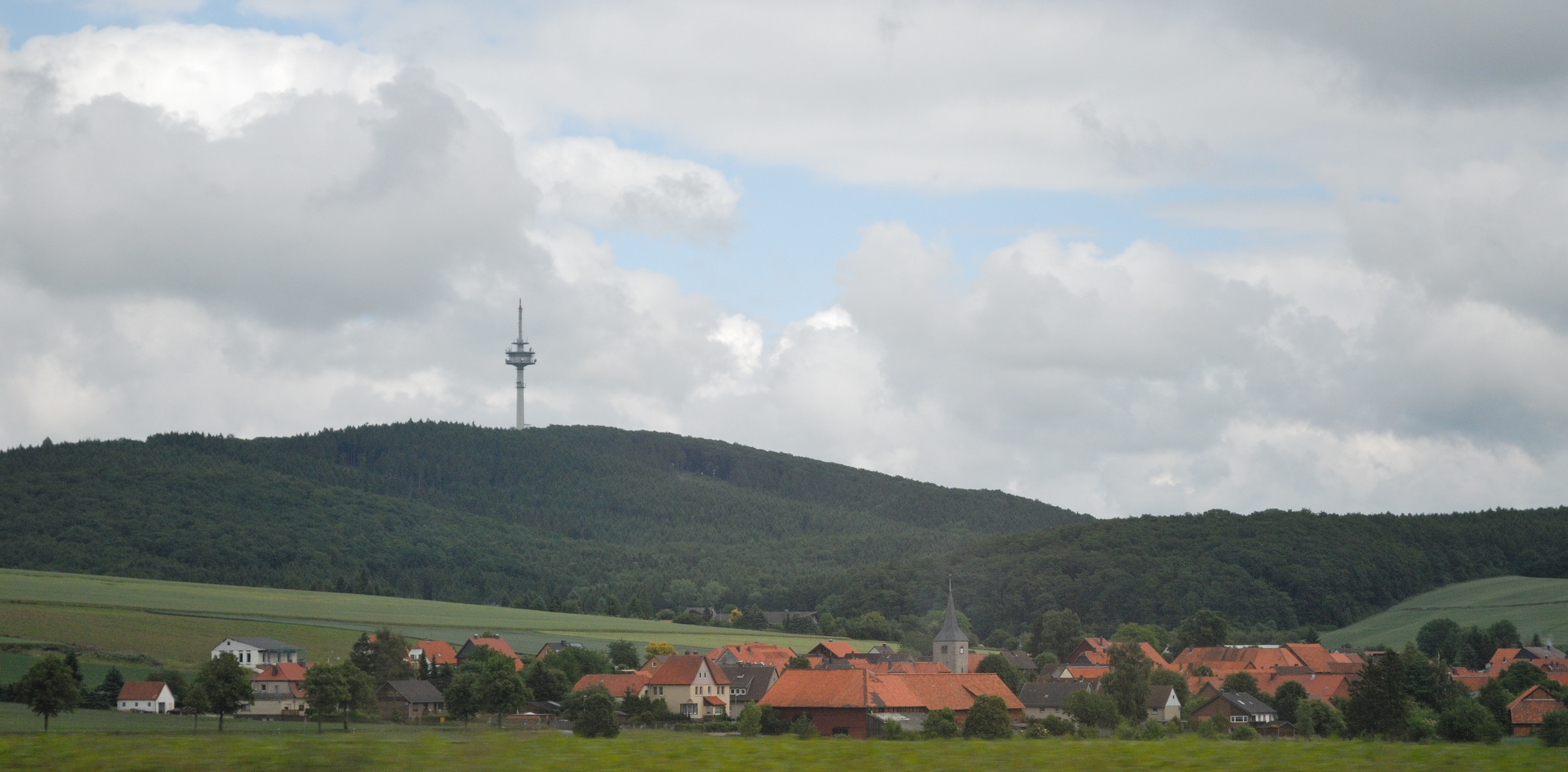
- View from an ICE train over Petze looking east-northeast to the Griesberg and Sibbesse Transmission Tower

Highest point
- Elevation: 358.9 m above sea level (NHN) (1,177 ft)
- Coordinates: 52°03′43″N 9°57′38″E

Geography
- Location within Lower Saxony
- Location: near Bad Salzdetfurth; Hildesheim; Lower Saxony (Germany)
- Parent range: Hildesheim Forest

At 358.9 m above sea level (NHN), the Griesberg near Bad Salzdetfurth in the Lower Saxon country of Hildesheim is the highest hill in the Hildesheim Forest, a small range of the Innerste Uplands.

== Geography ==
=== Location ===
The Griesberg is located in the southeast of the Hildesheim Forest between the town of Bad Salzdetfurth to the east and the village of Petze to the southwest in the east of the municipality of Sibbesse. Its summit region is on the territory of Almstedt, parts of the eastern and southern hillside are in the borough of Bad Salzdetfurth and other areas of the southwestern flank lie in the territory of Sibbesse. Southeast of the hill the Klusbach flows in a westerly direction into the Lamme and to the northwest is the Kalte Beuster, a right-hand headstream of the Beuster.

=== Natural regional classification ===
The Griesberg is part of the natural regional major unit group of the Weser-Leine Uplands (No. 37), the major unit of the Innerste Uplands (379), the sub-unit of the Hildesheim Upland (379.0) and the natural region of the Hildesheim Forest (379.01).

== Sibbesse Transmission Tower ==
In 1973, the 130-metre-high Sibbesse Transmission Tower (Fernmeldeturm Sibbesse) was built on the Griesberg. It is not open to the public. It acts as a non-public microwave link and broadcasts radio programmes to the surrounding area.

== Transport and walking ==
The Landesstraße 490 runs from north-to-south past the Griesberg to the west through Bad Salzdetfurth. In Östrum, the L 482 branches off and runs mainly northwestwards through Breinum, Almstedt, Segeste and Petze to Sibbesse. Both roads are starting points for walks over the hill along forest tracks and paths to the hill.
