= Wohldenberg Castle =

- Sillium
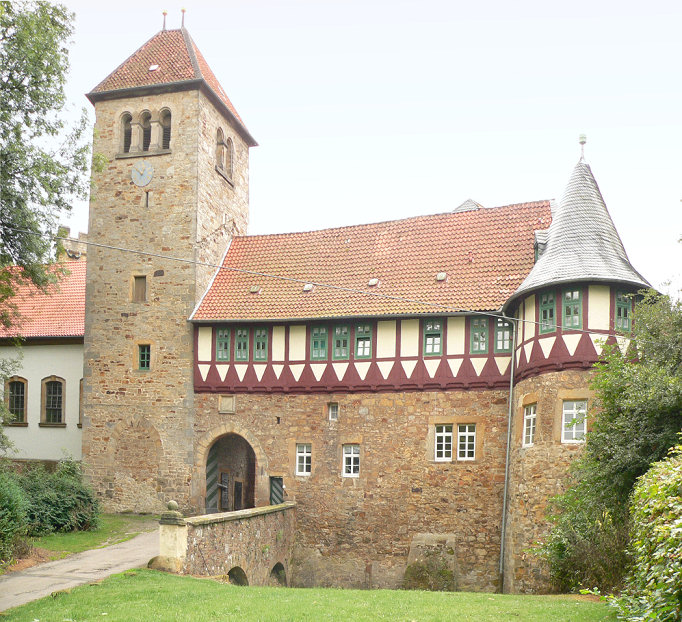
- Wohldenberg Castle, from left: Church, gate tower, gate and office house, corner tower

Site information
- Type: hill castle
- Code: DE-NI
- Condition: preserved or largely preserved

Location
- Coordinates: 52°03′31″N 10°09′11″E

Garrison information
- Occupants: counts

The Wohldenberg Castle is a ruin, located about one kilometer southwest of the small town Sillium. Sillium belongs to the municipality Holle in the district of Hildesheim (eastern Lower Saxony, Germany). Sillium’s emblem shows also the castle complex.

== Location ==
The Wohldenberg castle is a hill castle situated on the north western extensions of the Hainberg. It was built on top of a former offering stone to the pagan German deity Wodan on the 218 m high Wohldenberg, which is an elongate back of a mountain situated eastern as well as above the Nette valley. Because of strategic reasons the castle was built on a back of a mountain. The escarpments around the complex made it difficult to occupy. Here the northern entrance to the Ambergau was located and below the castle the trading route “Frankfurther Straße” with the route Hildesheim – Goslar crossed.

== Specifications ==
The castle area was separated into an outer bailey and main castle. Each had one inner yard, once there were even three of those inner yards. Still today the entrance to the bailey of the castle occurs by a gatehouse with a gate tower and a corner tower. Over the past moat spreads a bridge like driveway. In the upper part of the past main castle, which is not cognizable as this today anymore, is situated the 32 m high Bergfried. Other still existing buildings and ruins are parts of the up to 2 m thick enclosing wall and also the Catholic church St. Hubertus (1731), which was constructed baroque styled and arose from the former castle chapel.

== History ==
=== Medieval ===
Most likely the Wohldenberg castle was built by the count of Wöltingerode between 1153 and 1160. This process seemed to be associated with the territorial advance of this house into the Ambergau. Count Ludolf I made the Wohldenberg Castle his seat past 1174 after changing his ancestral seat in Wöltingerode into a Cistercians monastery, the monastery of Wöltingerode. Ludorf II yet called himself earl of Waldeberch in 1172. The following earls of Wöltingerode adopted more and more the name Wohldenberg. In the conflict between the emperor Frederick I called Barbossa and Henry the Lion the counts of the Wohldenberg were on the side of the emperor. For this reason the castle Wohldenberg was destroyed by Henry the Lion in 1180. Afterwards the castle was rebuilt and consequently the influence of the earls of Wohldenberg increased again. So Hermann von Wohldenberg got the Poppenburg as fief, after Conrad II, bishop of Hildesheim from 1221 – 1246, completed it as fortification.

In year 1275 the earls of Wohldenberg sold their shire including the castle to bishop Otto I of Hildesheim.

In the following years the Wohldenberg was consistently mortgaged and feoffed. But most of the time it was possessed by the bishopric of Hildesheim, as it is today again. Among other it was possessed by the earls of Wöltingerode who moved their domicile hereto in 1174. Their former domicile, castle Wöltingerode near Goslar, was at this time used as a Cistercians monastery, whose monks built up a distillery there. Temporarily robber-knights resided also at the castle Wohldenberg. In the beginning of the 14th century the castle stayed for a long time in the ownership of the Bortfeld family. Other owners of this time were:

- Aschwin Saldern
- Knight Wallmoden (1412)
- The Gentlemen of Bortfeld

=== Modern Age ===
After the Hildesheim Diocesan Feud (1519 to 1523) the castle and the office Wohldenberg were given to the Principality of Brunswick-Wolfenbüttel. The castle owner Aschwin von Bortfeld was expulsed from the castle by the new rulers without any compensation. In 1518 he donated the still existing plague column, which is a wayside shrine called “stony Jacob”, situated sub montane. In 1704 it was revised initiated through Drost Bocholtz

During the Thirty Years' War the Wohldenberg castle finally was destroyed by the Bockenem surrounding Imperial Army (Holy Roman Empire) in the year 1641. Subsequently the castle deteriorated further and in 1800 it was removed except from a few ruins of the wall. Beforehand inhabitants of Sillium used some of the wall bricks to raise a sheep shelter in the village and one inhabitant of Astenbeck bought the castle ruins for break off. Since 1858 the government in Hannover induced restoration actions. In this process the castle keep was added a viewing platform with merlons. Since then the castle ruin became a popular destination. The new office house located about 200 m below the castle was built in 1852 when the office Wohldenberg still had three big protectorates. After the office’s closure the author Oskar Meding lived there until 1896 and wrote his numerous historical novels. After his death the house was used as a hotel for a short time.

=== 20th century ===
During World War II the keep was used as an anti-aircraft tower. Since 1668 a vicarage of the Catholic Church’s community Wohldenberg is housed in the castle’s gate house. Sub montane a residential house is situated which was a hostelry in 1561. The new office house sub montane was bought in 1920 by the Caritas of the diocese (see also: Roman Catholic Diocese of Hildesheim). Since 1964 there is also a youth-educational institution of the Catholic Church in the “House Wohldenberg”.

== Literature ==
- Maria Behnke: Burg Wohldenberg in Vergangenheit und Gegenwart. Bernward Verlag, Hildesheim 1961 (2. Auflage 1973)
- Jan Habermann: Verbündete Vasallen. Die Netzwerke von Grafen und Herren am Nordwestharz im Spannungsgefüge zwischen rivalisierenden Fürstgewalten (ca. 1250-1400). Norderstedt 2011, ISBN 978-3-8423-0704-9
- Wolfgang Petke: Die Grafen von Wöltingerode-Wohldenberg. Adelsherrschaft, Königtum und Landesherrschaft am Nordwestharz im 12. und 13. Jahrhundert (Veröffentlichungen des Instituts für historische Landesforschungen der Universität Göttingen IV) Hildesheim: August Lax 1971.
- Ernst Andreas Friedrich: Die Burg Wohldenberg, S. 125-127, in: Wenn Steine reden könnten. Band IV, Landbuch-Verlag, Hannover 1998, ISBN 3-7842-0558-5
- Hans Adolf Schultz: Burgen und Schlösser des Braunschweiger Landes, Braunschweig 1980, ISBN 3-87884-012-8
