= Vorholz =

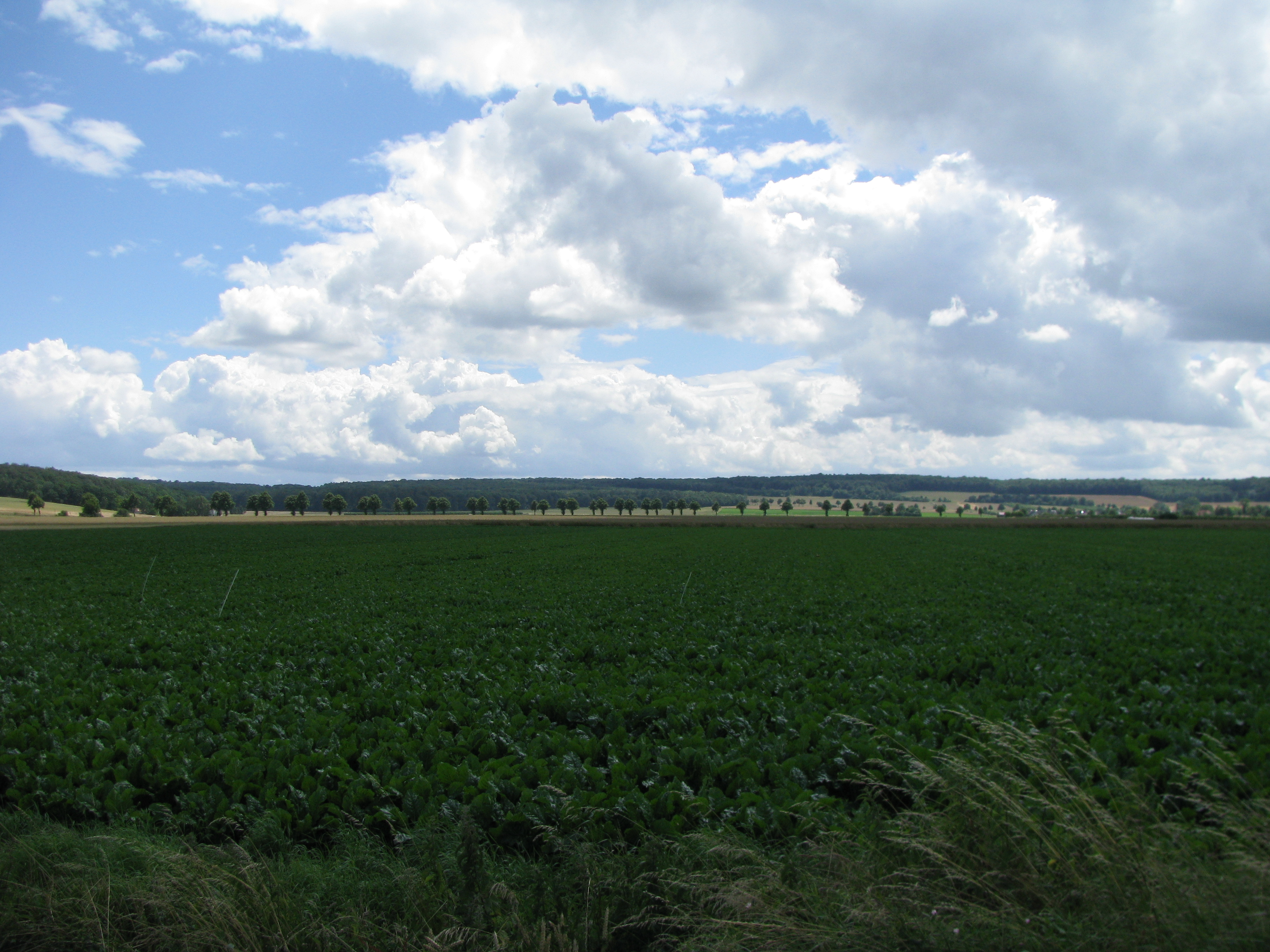
- View from the area of Ottbergen looking SE towards the Vorholz near Langer Berg

Highest point
- Peak: Knebelberg
- Elevation: 243 m above NHN

Geography
- Location within Lower Saxony
- State(s): Counties of Hildesheim and Wolfenbüttel; Lower Saxony (Germany)
- Range coordinates: 52°07′38″N 10°06′10″E
- Parent range: Innerste Uplands

The Vorholz is a ridge up to 243 m high in the districts of Hildesheim and Wolfenbüttel in the German state of Lower Saxony.

== Geography ==
The heavily-wooded Vorholz is located in the north of the Innerste Uplands, part of the Lower Saxon Hills. It lies north of the valley of the River Innerste between the ridges of Lichtenberge (northwestern section of the Salzgitter Hills) to the southeast, the Hainberg to the south-southeast, the Sauberge to the south-southwest and the Hildesheim Forest to the west-southwest. It is also east-southeast of the city of Hildesheim and west of Salzgitter between Schellerten in the north, Burgdorf in the east-northeast and Holle in the south.

== Description ==
The Vorholz attains its highest point on the summit of the Knebelberg, 243 m high, and is the source region for several tributaries of the Innerste (which touches it tangentially in the south) and the Fuhse (which is some way to the northeast). It is crossed by numerous walking and forest trails. There is a transmission tower on the Barenberg near Grasdorf and a derelict observation tower on the Ortsberg near Astenbeck.

A section of the A 7 autobahn runs in an east-west direction through the Vorholz, as does part of the B 6 highway. The B 444 runs north-south through the ridge.

== Elevations ==
The elevations of the Vorholz include:

- Knebelberg (243 m above NN)
- Barenberg (227 m) - with transmission tower
- Heidelbeerenberg (221 m)
- Langer Berg (216 m)
- Großer Steinberg (213 m)
- Wenser Berg (209 m)
- Spitzhut (207 m)
- Ilsenberg (201 m)
- Mieckenberg (200 m)
- Kleiner Steinberg (175 m)
- Thieberg (175 m)
- Galgenberg (172 m) - with observation tower
- Rehberg (165 m)
- Ortsberg (157 m) - with observation tower

== Towns and villages ==
The towns and villages in and around the Vorholz are:

- Burgdorf to the northeast
- Hildesheim to the west-northwest
- Holle to the south
- Salzgitter to the east
- Nettlingen to the north
