= Hildesheim Forest =

Hill range in Germany

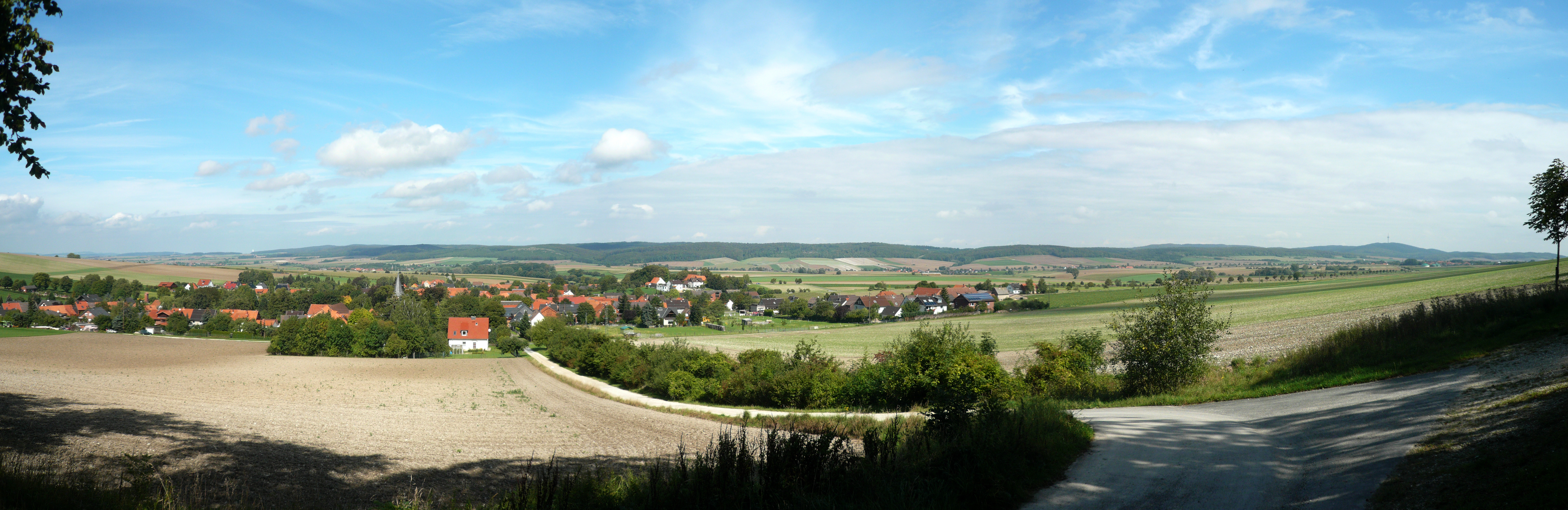
- The Hildesheim Forest from the southwest. At the far right: the Griesberg.

Highest point
- Peak: Griesberg
- Elevation: 358.9 m (1,177 ft)
- Coordinates: 52°3′43.2″N 9°57′37.8″E

Naming
- Native name: Hildesheimer Wald (German)

Geography
- Location: Hildesheim, Lower Saxony
- Country: Germany
- Parent range: Lower Saxon Hills, Innerste Uplands

The Hildesheim Forest (German: Hildesheimer Wald) is a range of hills up to 359 m above sea level (NN) in the district of Hildesheim in the German state of Lower Saxony.

== Geography ==
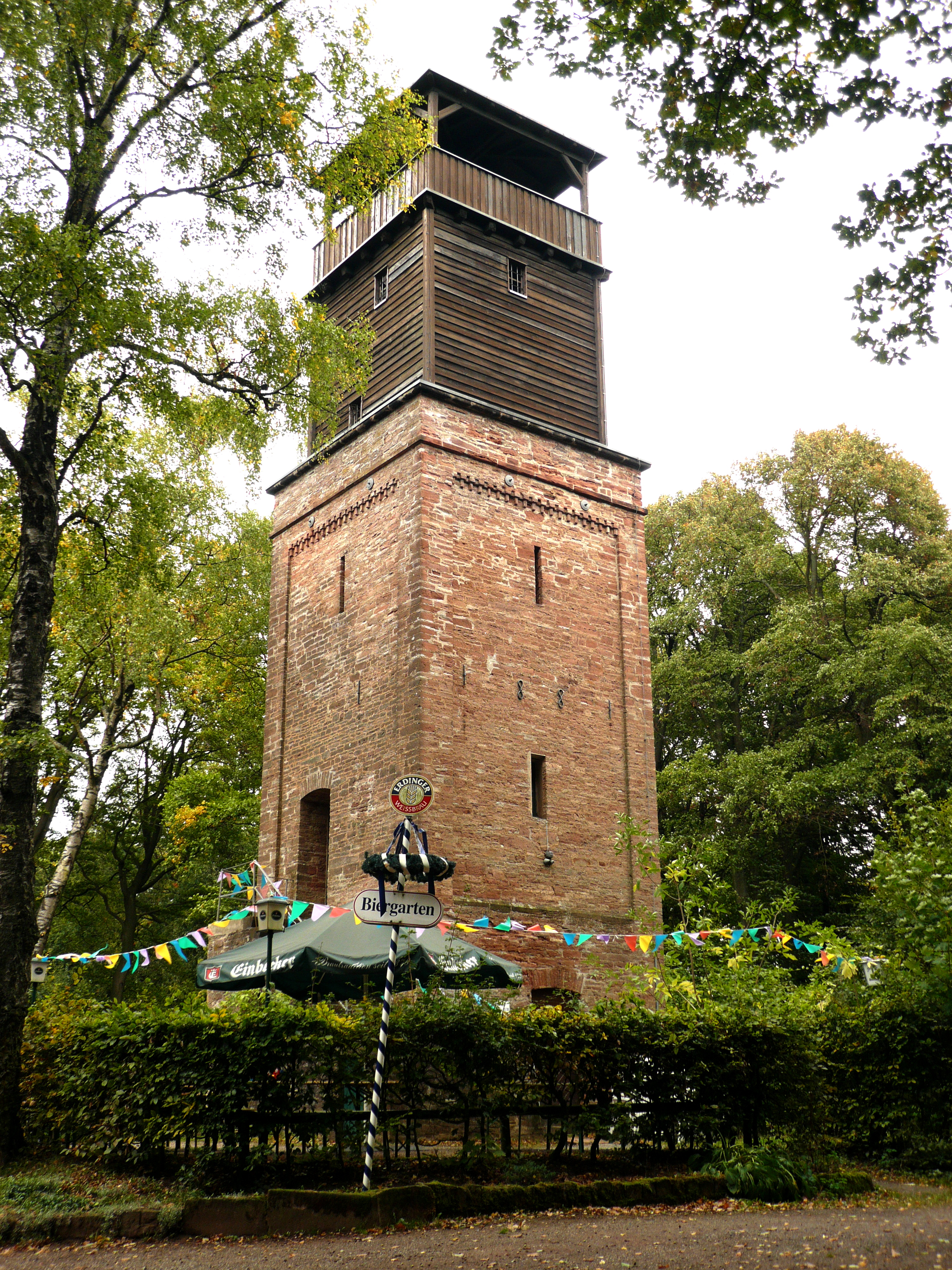
The Hildesheim observation tower in the Hildesheim Forest

The Hildesheim Forest is located in the Innerste Uplands, part of the Lower Saxon Hills, between the valleys of the Leine to the west, the Innerste to the north and the Lamme to the east. These densely forested hills, which are bordered to the east by the Sauberge and lie a few kilometres west-southwest of the Vorholz, fill an area south of Hildesheim, northwest of Bad Salzdetfurth, north of Sibbesse and southeast of Nordstemmen.

== Description ==
The Hildesheim Forest, which attain a height of 359 m in the Griesberg, are crossed by numerous waterways, hiking trails and forest tracks, but only by one state road, the L 485, which links Hildesheim via Diekholzen to Sibbesse. In its northwestern part is the Beusterburg, whose circular ramparts are suggestive of a New Stone Age settlement. In the vicinity of the village of Betheln there is a Bronze Age burial site (Hügelgräberfeld). Further away from the village there is also a number of brine springs. At the northern end of the Hildesheim Forest is the Heyersum Saltworks (Saline Heyersum). In addition there is a transmission tower on the Griesberg and several observation towers.

A section of the Hanover–Würzburg high-speed railway runs through the Hildesheim Forest through three tunnels (see the section on ‘hills’), over bridges and on stretches of open line.

== Hills ==
Amongst the hills and elevations of the Hildesheim Forest are the following:
(the tunnels mentioned through 3 of the hills belong to the Hanover–Würzburg high-speed railway)

- Griesberg (358.9 m AMSL; with a transmission tower)
- Bösenberg (339.0 m)
- Steinberg (322.6 m)
- Tosmarberg (319.9 m; with the ruins of an observation tower)
- Rosenberg (311)
- Hammberg (306 m)
- Querberg (302.6 m)
- Langer Kopf (288 m)
- Welfenhöhe (282.0 m; with an observation tower, the Kabusturm)
- Sonnenberg (281.9 m; with the Hildesheim observation tower; 1881)
- Süllberg (276.6 m)
- Wohlberg (273 m)
- Schierenberg (267 m)
- Auf dem Herze (265.5 m)
- Eichenberg (263.0 m; with the Eichenberg Tunnel, 1,157 m long)
- Triesberg (261.0 m)
- Beusterberg (ca. 260 m; with the circular ramparts of the Beusterburg)
- Rottsberg (259 m)
- Escherberg (257.1 m; with the Escherberg Tunnel, 3,687 m long)
- Dröhnenberg (252 m)
- Hinterberg (249 m)
- Haiberg (248.0 m)
- Brandberg (247.0 m)
- Klusberg (245 m)
- Lerchenberg, (243 m)
- Hamberg (242.0 m)
- Steinberg (242 m)
- Linkkopf (241.3 m)
- Eggeberg (ca. 240 m; with the Eggeberg Tunnel, 332 m long)
- Roter Berg (239 m; with Landesstraße L 485)
- Kneppelberg (236.3 m)
- Stuckenberg (227 m)
- Ziegenberg (218 m)
- Schieferberg (216 m)
- Klingenberg (207 m)
- Emilienhöhe (201 m)

== Waterways ==
These are some of the streams that rise in the Hildesheim Forest:

- Despe (eastern tributary of the Leine)
- Gehlenbach (western tributary of the Lamme)
- Kalte Beuster (right and southeastern source stream of the Beuster)
- Klusbach (western tributary of the Lamme)
- Warme Beuster (left and northwestern source stream of the Beuster)

The following waterways flow past the Hildesheim Forest:

- Alme (tributary of the Riehe)
- Innerste (tributary of the Leine)
- Lamme (tributary of the Innerste)
- Leine (tributary of the Aller)
- Riehe (tributary of the Lamme)
- Trillkebach (tributary of the Innerste)

== Settlements ==
Towns and villages in and around the Hildesheim Forest:

- Almstedt
- Bad Salzdetfurth
- Betheln
- Despetal
- Diekholzen
- Hildesheim
- Nordstemmen
- Sibbesse

52°5′N 9°54′E
