= Giesen Hills =

Hill ridge in Germany

Coordinates: 52°11′15″N 9°53′40″E

The Giesen Hills (German: Giesener Berge) are a ridge, up to 242.5 metres high, in the district of Hildesheim in the German state of Lower Saxony.

== Geography ==
The ridge of the Giesen Hills is located in the extreme north of the Innerste Uplands, a northeastern element of the Lower Saxon Hills. It lies between sections of the River Innerste to the east and the River Leine to the west, north of Himmelsthür (northwest of Hildesheim) and south of Giesen.

== Description ==
The Giesen Hills reach their highest point in an unnamed summit, 162.6 metres high. The wooded northern part of the ridge is crossed by a few footpaths and forest tracks. Towards the east the land falls away to the Innerste, that flows close by the ridge from south to north. To the west the hills descend gradually towards the Leine, that runs past them, also in a south to north direction, some 6 kilometres away.

Immediately adjacent to the Giesen Hills to the south is a local military training area, on whose western edge the Osterberg (181 m above NN) rises, but which is not considered part of this landscape unit. The B 6 federal road runs past the ridge to the east – roughly parallel to the Innerste – and still further east is the Hildesheim Canal, which runs from north to south along, and a section of the A 7 motorway.

== Settlements ==
The settlements around the Giesen Hills are: Giesen (on the northern rim) and Himmelsthür (to the northwest of Hildesheim; on the southern edge).
