= Hildesheim Börde =

Coordinates: 52.1936°N 10.0306°E

The Hildesheim Börde (German: Hildesheimer Börde or Braunschweig-Hildesheimer Lössbörde) is a natural region, 272 km^{2} in area, in the northern part of Hildesheim district, which is known for its especially rich black earth loess soil.

== Location ==
The börde landscape is located in the pentagon of land between Hanover - Peine - Brunswick - Salzgitter - Hildesheim and is dominated by arable countryside with no large towns or cities. The natural boundaries of the area are: to the west the Leine, to the north the Burgdorf-Peine Geest, to the south the Innerste Uplands and Hildesheim Forest. To the west is the Calenberg Loess Börde of Calenberg Land. To the east in the direction of Brunswick it transitions gradually into the Magdeburg Börde. These Börde landscapes are part of the Central European loess zone, which lies north of the Central Uplands and stretches from Belgium in the west to Western Ukraine in the east.

Based on the type of land surface and drainage situation, the Hildesheim Börde is further divided into five areas:

- Hildesheim Börde
- Gödringen Hills
- Ilsede Börde
- Nettlingen Ridge
- Lebenstedt Börde
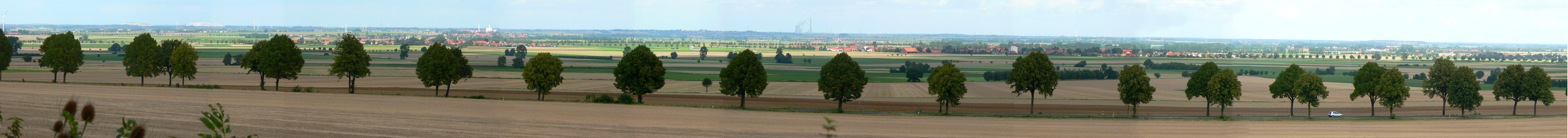
View over the Hildesheim Börde from the motorway services of the same name on the A 7 looking north. Left: two potash slag heaps near Sehnde 20 km away; centre: the Mehrum power station also 20 km distant with its grey chimney and cooling tower; foreground: the avenue of the B 6 federal road

== Soils ==
The Hildesheim Börde region is almost entirely covered by a layer of ice age loess to a depth of up to 2 m. Its soils are the most fertile in Germany and it has been cultivated for 4,000 years. Today the soils of the börde secure annual record harvests for the local farmers. This enables demanding crops such as sugar beet and wheat to be grown. The land produces an average of 0.8 kg of wheat or 5.5 kg of sugar beet. The dark soil raises the temperature of the ground which extends the annual growing period.

== Woods and settlements ==
The region has a gently undulating landscape with low hills. Large areas are used for arable farming and woods are rare in the Börde due to the intensive way in which the land is used, so much so that it is sometimes referred to as a 'wheat or sugar beet steppe'. Most of the trees are isolated and only hedges and bushes along the roads and streams break up the scene. Most of the settlements are clustered villages (Haufendörfer). Their houses were built close together in order not to waste valuable farmland.

== Soil value ==
After the Second World War the farmland at Eickendorf in the Magdeburg Börde, where German soil values were measured in 1934, was no longer available for West German comparison testing due to the division of Germany. As a result, a federal facility for testing soil values was established at Harsum, part of Machtsum, which was located within the Hildesheim Börde. This has fixed the agricultural comparator (Landwirtschaftliche Vergleichszahl or LVZ) at a value of 100. Machtsum lies 10 kilometres northeast of Hildesheim. On later measurements a still higher LVZ value of 102.8 was obtained near Mölme, the highest value recorded in Germany to date. Mölme lies about 20 km east of Hildesheim and is part of the municipality of Söhlde.

== Transport ==
The AB 7 autobahn crosses the western part of the Hildesheim Börde. From the motorway services of Autobahnraststätte Hildesheimer Börde, situated on a rise a few kilometres southeast of Hildesheim, there is a view of the landscape up to about 20 km away towards the north. The Mittelland Canal runs north of the Börde in an east–west direction. The river Fuhse crosses the area from southeast to north.

== Literature ==
- Hildesheimer and Kalenberger Börde. Natur and Landschaft im Landkreis Hildesheim. Mitteilungen der Paul-Feindt-Stiftung, Hildesheim 2005, ISBN 3-8067-8547-3
