= Neile =

River in Germany

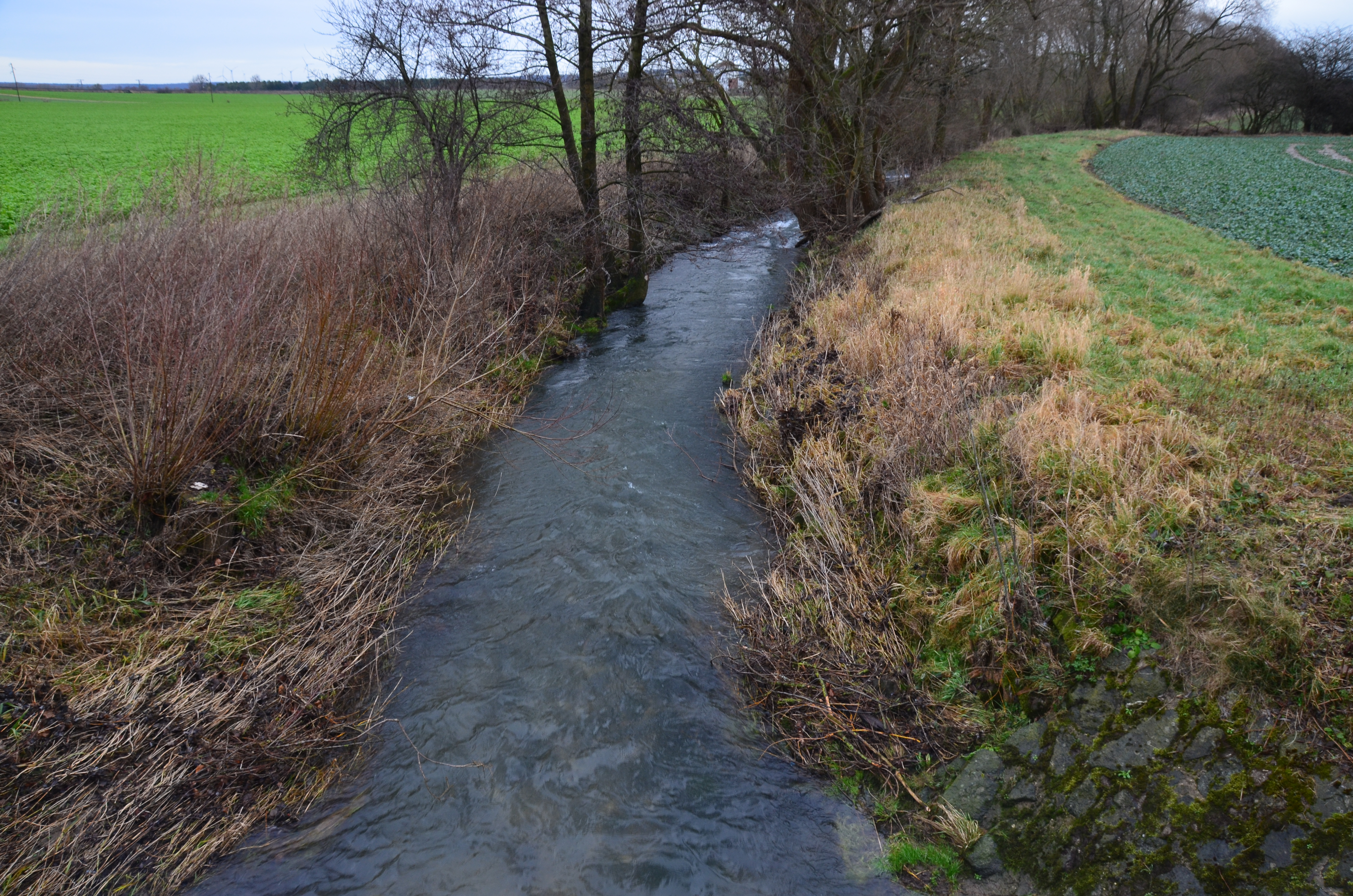

Location
- Country: Germany
- State: Lower Saxony

Physical characteristics
- Mouth
  - location: Innerste
  - coordinates: 52.0334°N 10.2862°E
- Length: 17.1 km (10.6 mi)

Basin features
- Progression: Innerste→ Leine→ Aller→ Weser→ North Sea

Neile is a river of Lower Saxony, Germany. It flows into the Innerste near Sehlde.

== See also ==
- List of rivers of Lower Saxony
