= Sehlde =

- Municipality
- Location of Sehlde within Wolfenbüttel district
- Interactive map of Sehlde
- Location within Germany Location within Lower Saxony
- Coordinates: 52°03′N 10°16′E
- Country: Germany
- State: Lower Saxony
- District: Wolfenbüttel
- Municipal assoc.: Baddeckenstedt

Government
  - Mayor: Reinhard Päsler (SPD)

Area
  - Total: 20.38 km^{2} (7.87 sq mi)
- Elevation: 120 m (390 ft)

Population (2025-12-31)
  - Total: 846
  - Density: 41.5/km^{2} (108/sq mi)
- Time zone: UTC+01:00 (CET)
  - Summer (DST): UTC+02:00 (CEST)
- Postal codes: 38279
- Dialling codes: 05341
- Vehicle registration: WF

Sehlde is a municipality in the district of Wolfenbüttel, in Lower Saxony, Germany.
