= Beuster (Innerste) =

River in Germany

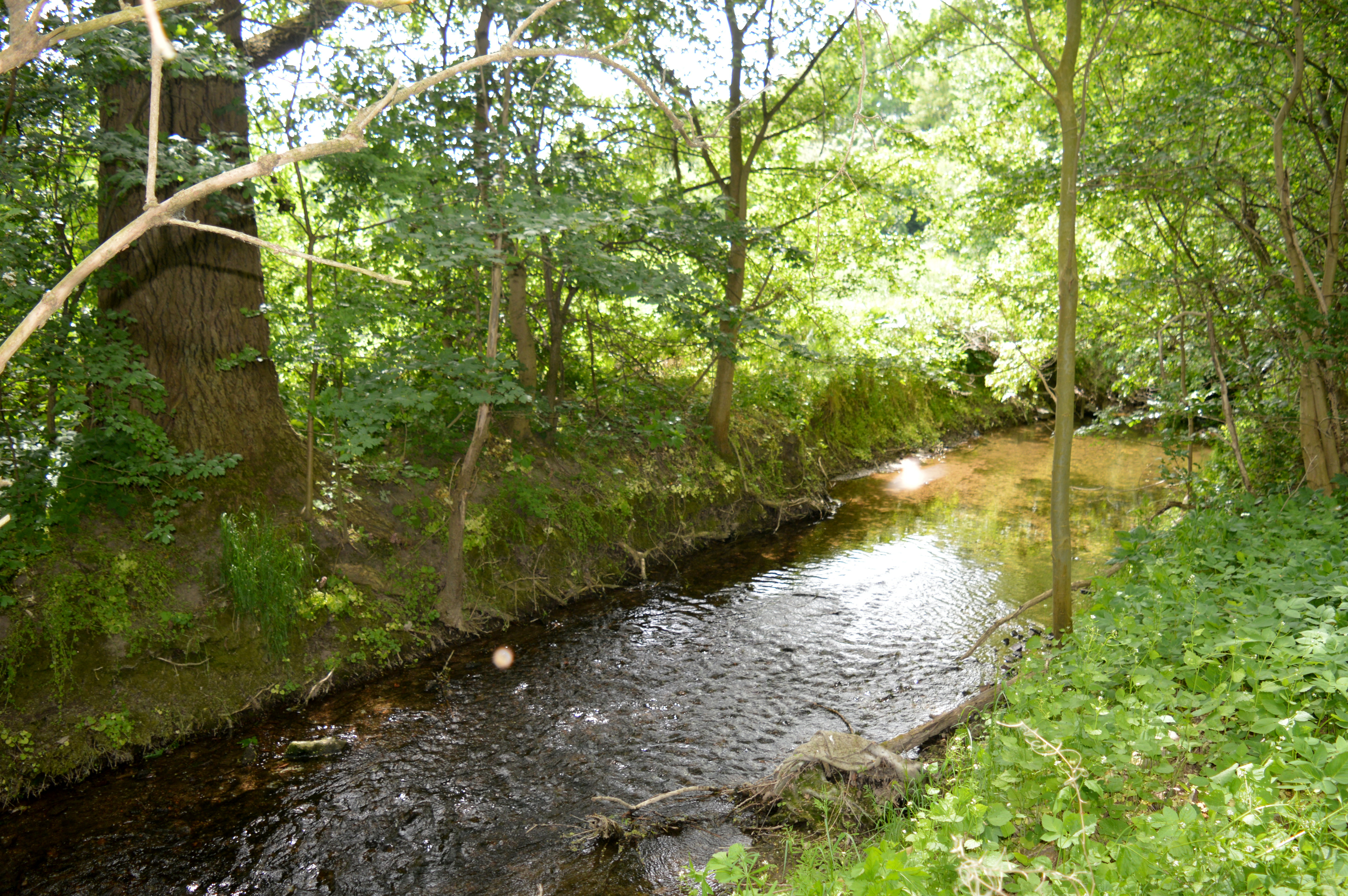

Location
- Country: Germany
- State: Lower Saxony

Physical characteristics
- Mouth
  - location: Innerste
  - coordinates: 52.1192°N 9.9797°E
- Length: 12.5 km (7.8 mi)

Basin features
- Progression: Innerste→ Leine→ Aller→ Weser→ North Sea

Beuster is a river of Lower Saxony, Germany. It flows into the Innerste south of Hildesheim. Its total length, including its source river Warme Beuster, is 12.5 km (7.8 mi).

== See also ==
- List of rivers of Lower Saxony
