= Nette (Innerste) =

River in Germany

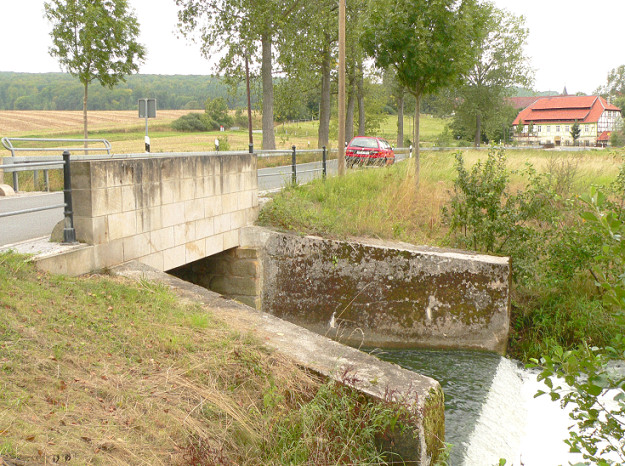
- The Nette near Henneckenrode

Location
- Country: Germany
- State: Lower Saxony

Physical characteristics
- Source
  - location: near Herrhausen am Harz (a district of Seesen)
  - elevation: ca. 365 m above sea level (NN)
- Mouth
  - location: near Derneburg into the Innerste
  - coordinates: 52°06′05″N 10°06′39″E
  - elevation: ca. 90 m above sea level (NN)
- Length: 42.6 km (26.5 mi)
- Basin size: 310 km^{2} (120 sq mi)

Basin features
- Progression: Innerste→ Leine→ Aller→ Weser→ North Sea
- Landmarks: Large towns: Seesen; Small towns: Bockenem
- Tributaries
  - right: Schildau, Ortshäuser Bach

Nette (German pronunciation: [ˈnɛtə]) is a river in Lower Saxony, Germany, a left tributary of the Innerste.

The Nette rises in the Harz, in the municipality of Seesen. The Nette flows through Bockenem before reaching the Innerste in Holle, between Hildesheim and Salzgitter.

== See also ==
- List of rivers of Lower Saxony
