= Lamme =

River in Germany

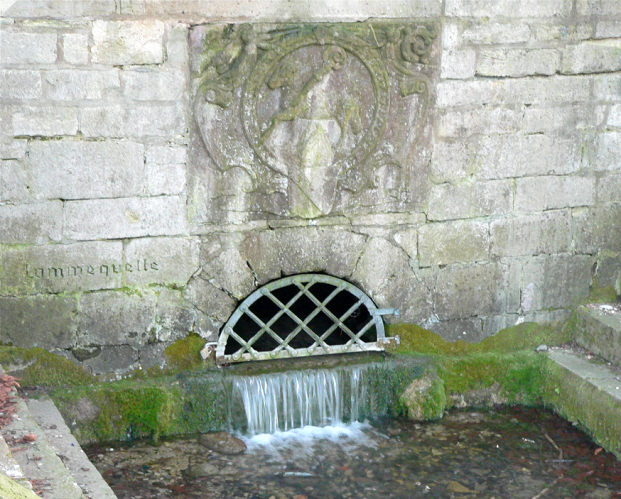

Location
- Country: Germany
- State: Lower Saxony

Physical characteristics
- Mouth
  - location: Innerste
  - coordinates: 52.0987°N 10.0333°E
- Length: 22.4 km (13.9 mi)

Basin features
- Progression: Innerste→ Leine→ Aller→ Weser→ North Sea

Lamme is a river of Lower Saxony, Germany. It flows into the Innerste near Bad Salzdetfurth. In 1945 the river was crossed by Allied Forces.

== See also ==
- List of rivers of Lower Saxony
