= Holle =

- Municipality
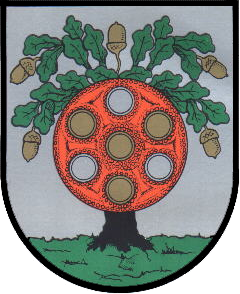
- Coat of arms

- Location of Holle within Hildesheim district
- Interactive map of Holle
- Location within Germany Location within Lower Saxony
- Coordinates: 52°05′30″N 10°09′30″E
- Country: Germany
- State: Lower Saxony
- District: Hildesheim

Government
  - Mayor (2021–26): Falk-Olaf Hoppe (CDU)

Area
  - Total: 61.25 km^{2} (23.65 sq mi)
- Elevation: 116 m (381 ft)

Population (2025-12-31)
  - Total: 6,514
  - Density: 106.4/km^{2} (275.4/sq mi)
- Time zone: UTC+01:00 (CET)
  - Summer (DST): UTC+02:00 (CEST)
- Postal codes: 31188
- Dialling codes: 05062
- Vehicle registration: HI
- Website: www.holle.de

Holle (German pronunciation: [ˈhɔlə]) is a village and a municipality in the district of Hildesheim, in Lower Saxony, Germany. It is situated approximately 15 km southeast of Hildesheim, and 15 km west of Salzgitter. It was mentioned in Tom Clancy's bestseller Red Storm Rising.

One of the villages in this municipality is Derneburg . The castle there, Schloss Derneburg , is since 2007 the site of one out of two modern art museums of the Hall Art Foundation. A famous German artist, Georg Baselitz, had lived and worked in this castle from 1975 until 2006.

In the tiny village of Söder, 7 km south of Holle, a baroque castle housed a famous art collection, owned by the Von Brabeck family, until it was sold at a remarkable auction in 1859.

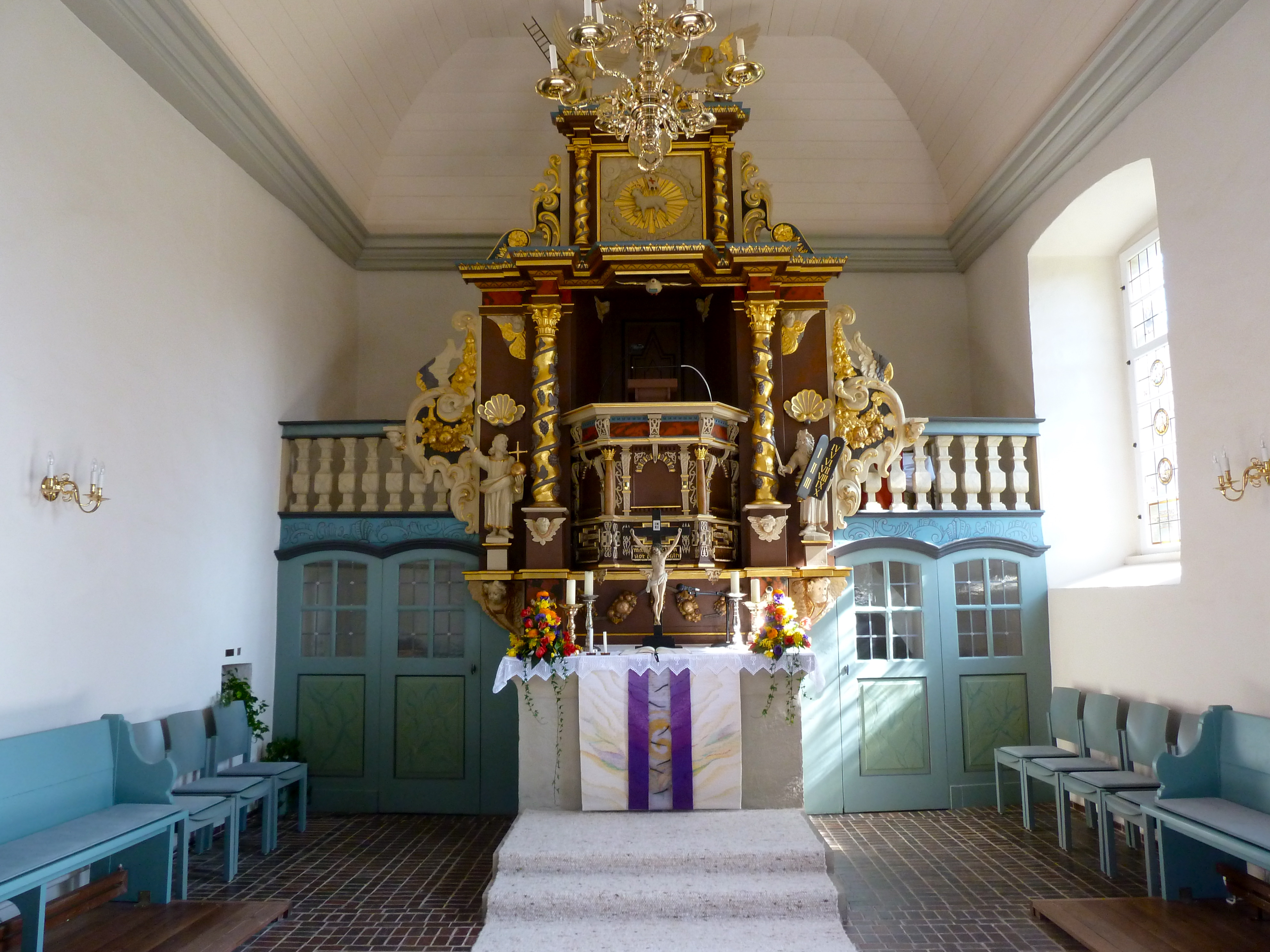
Interior of Saint Martin's Church, Holle

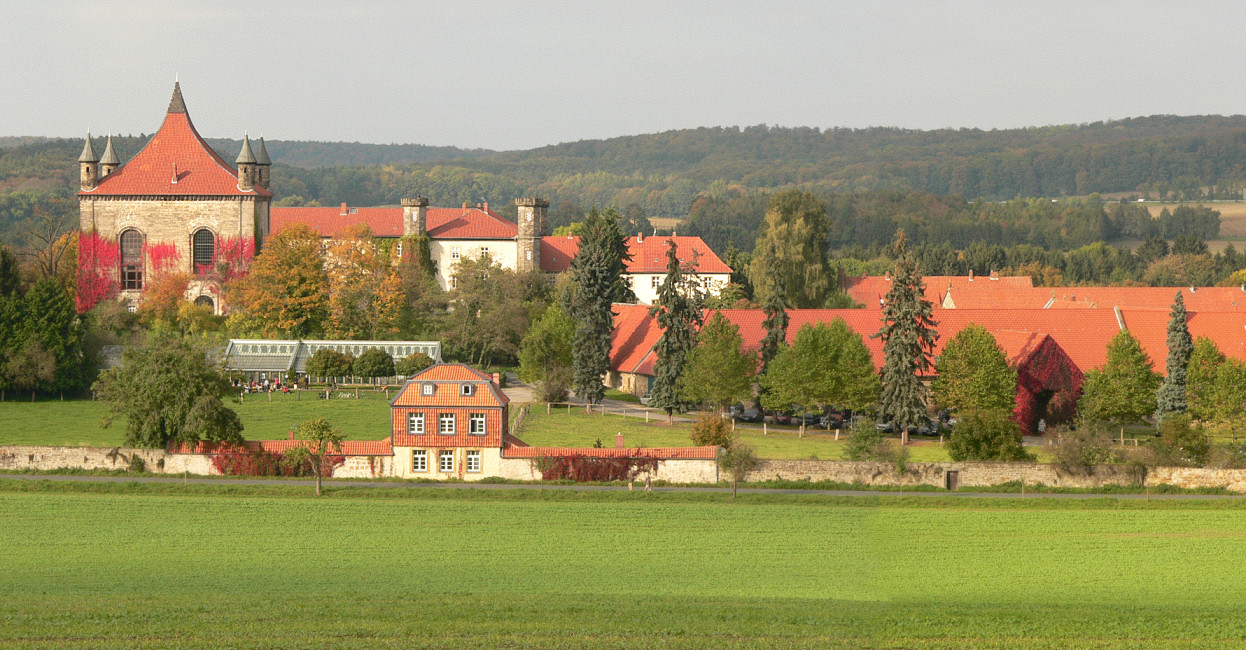
Castle of Derneburg; in the foreground museum and café Glass House

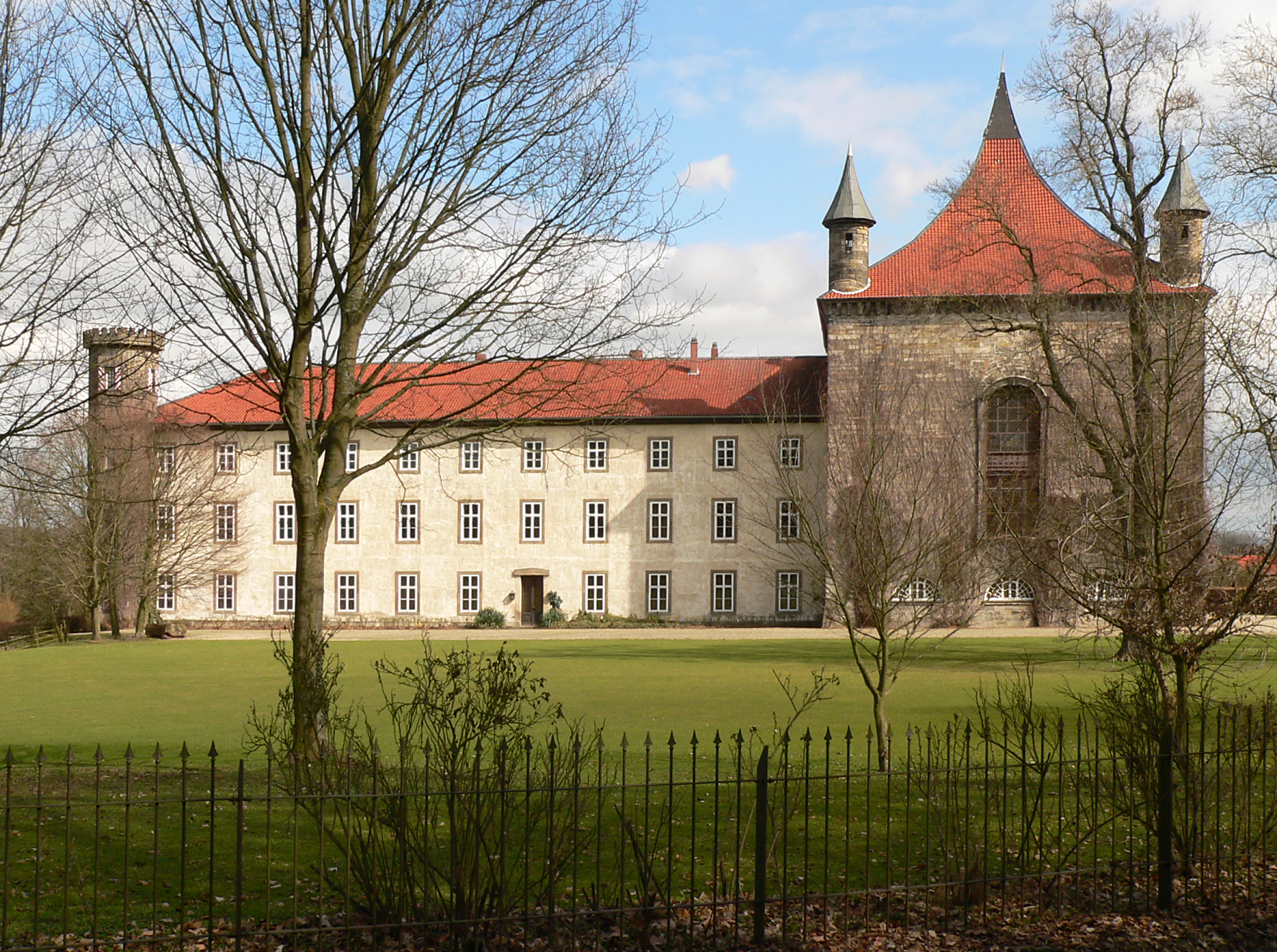
West wing of Derneburg Castle

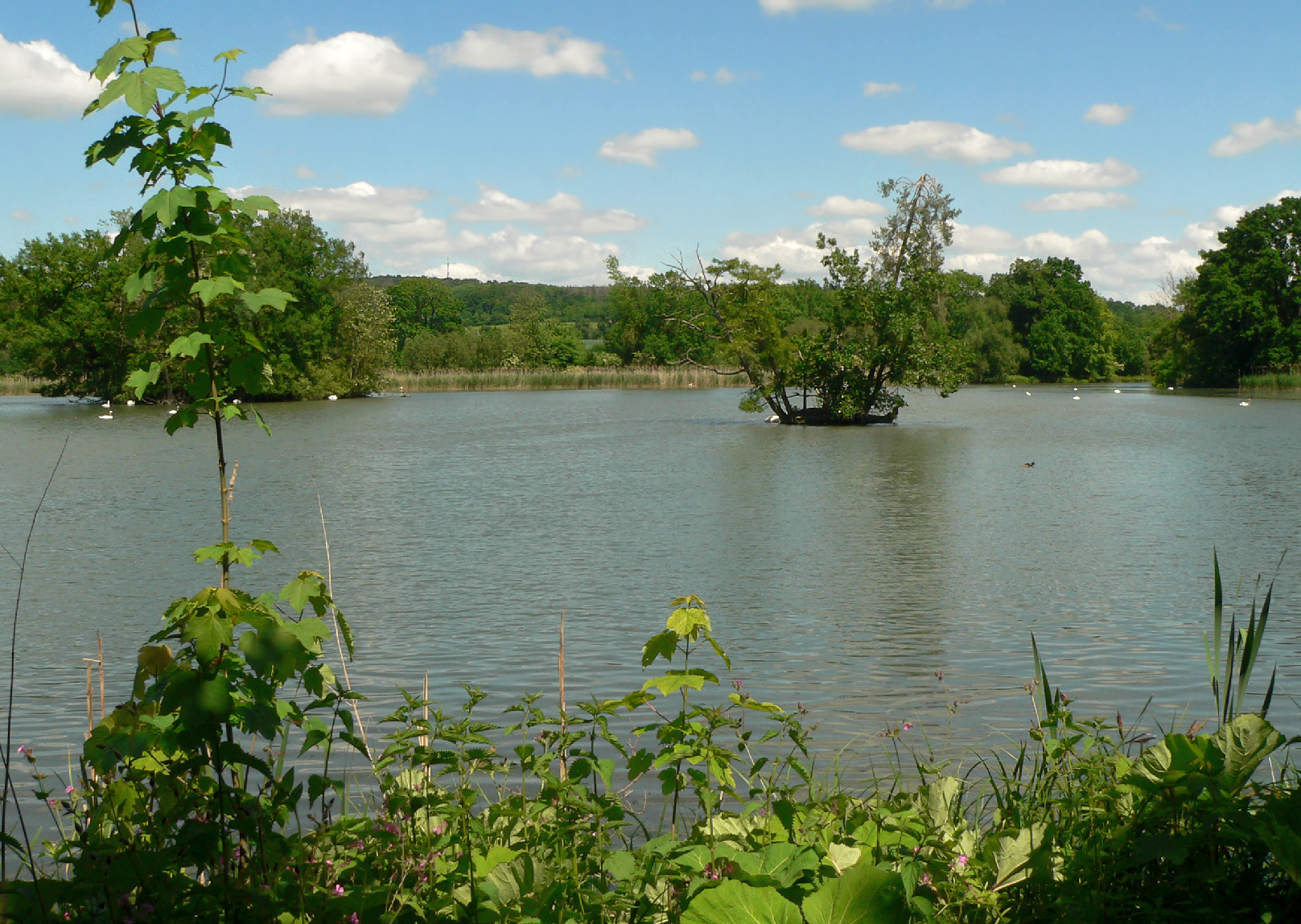
The Mariensee, one of the Derneburg Fishing Ponds

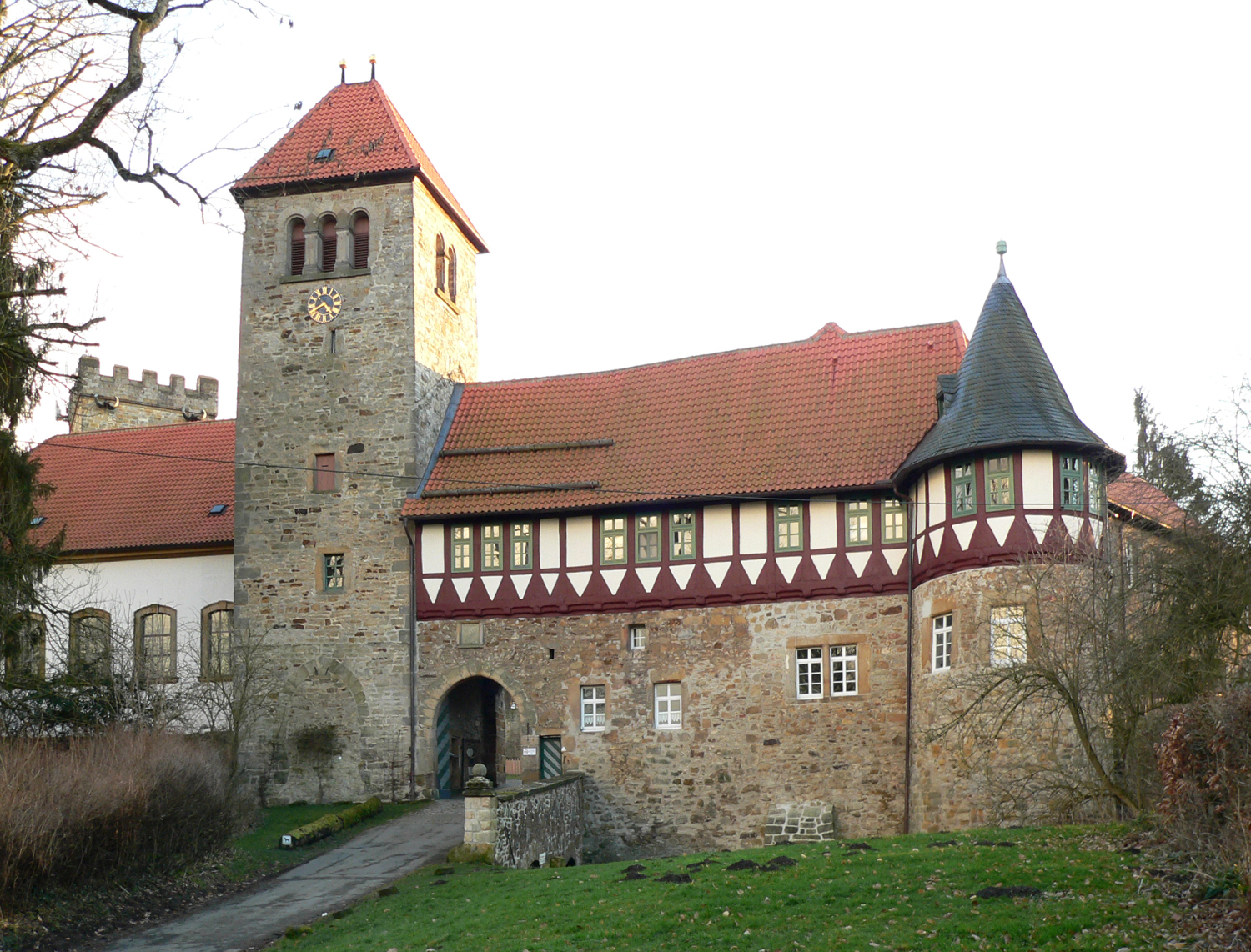
Wohldenberg Castle near Sillium, south of Holle (1)

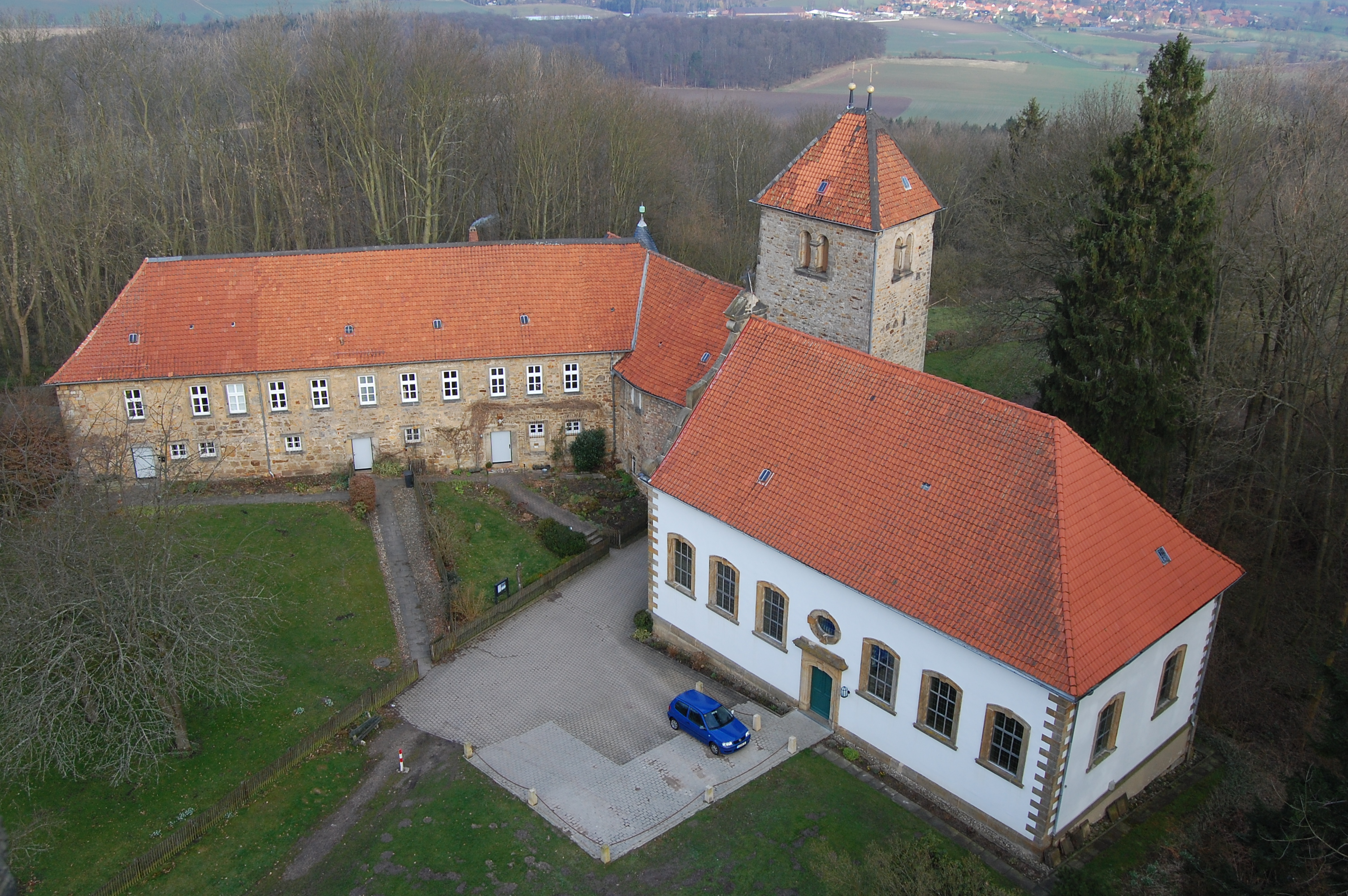
Wohldenberg Castle (2)

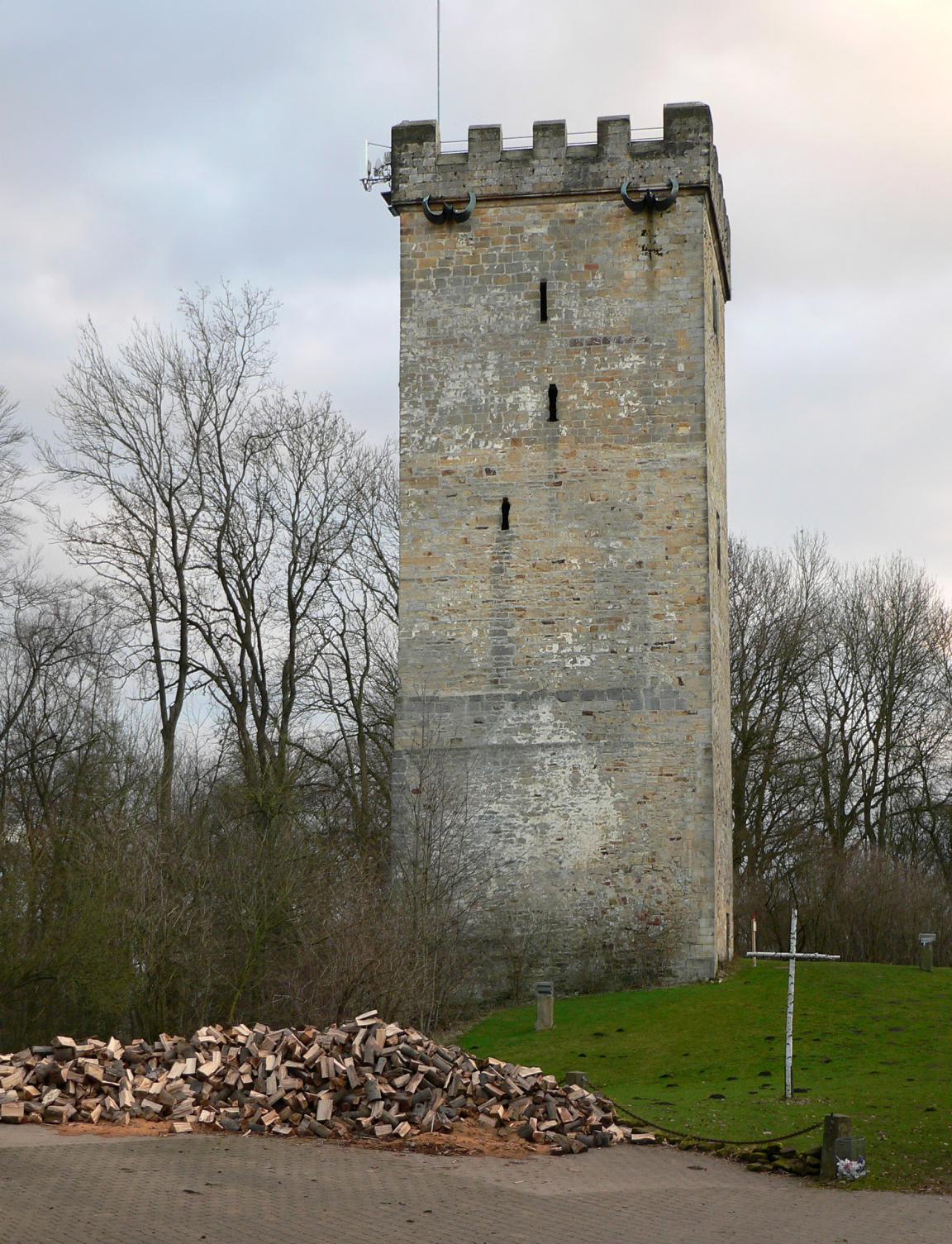
Bergfried Oberburg, a tower near this castle

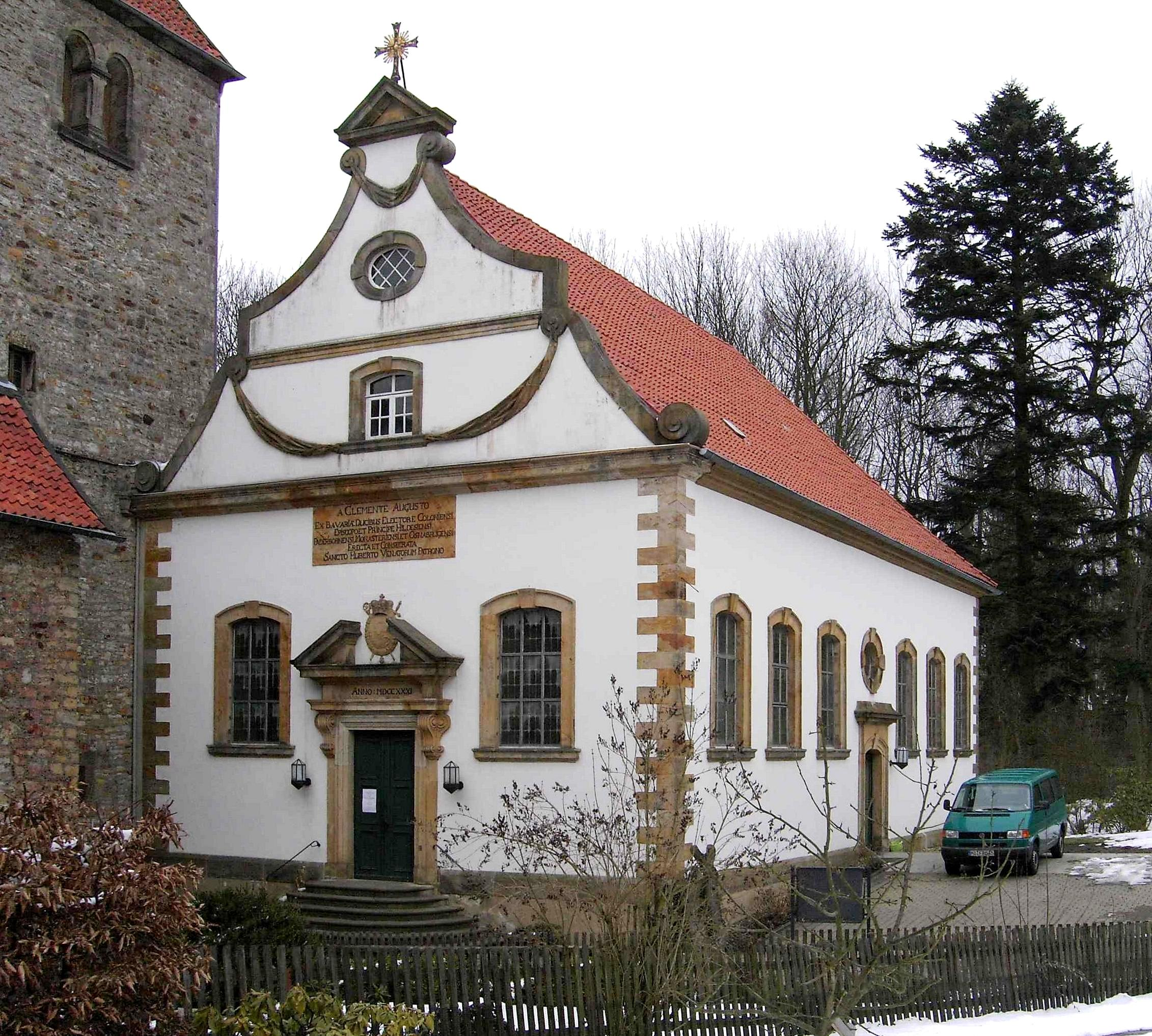
Baroque St.-Hubert' s Church near Wohldenberg Castle

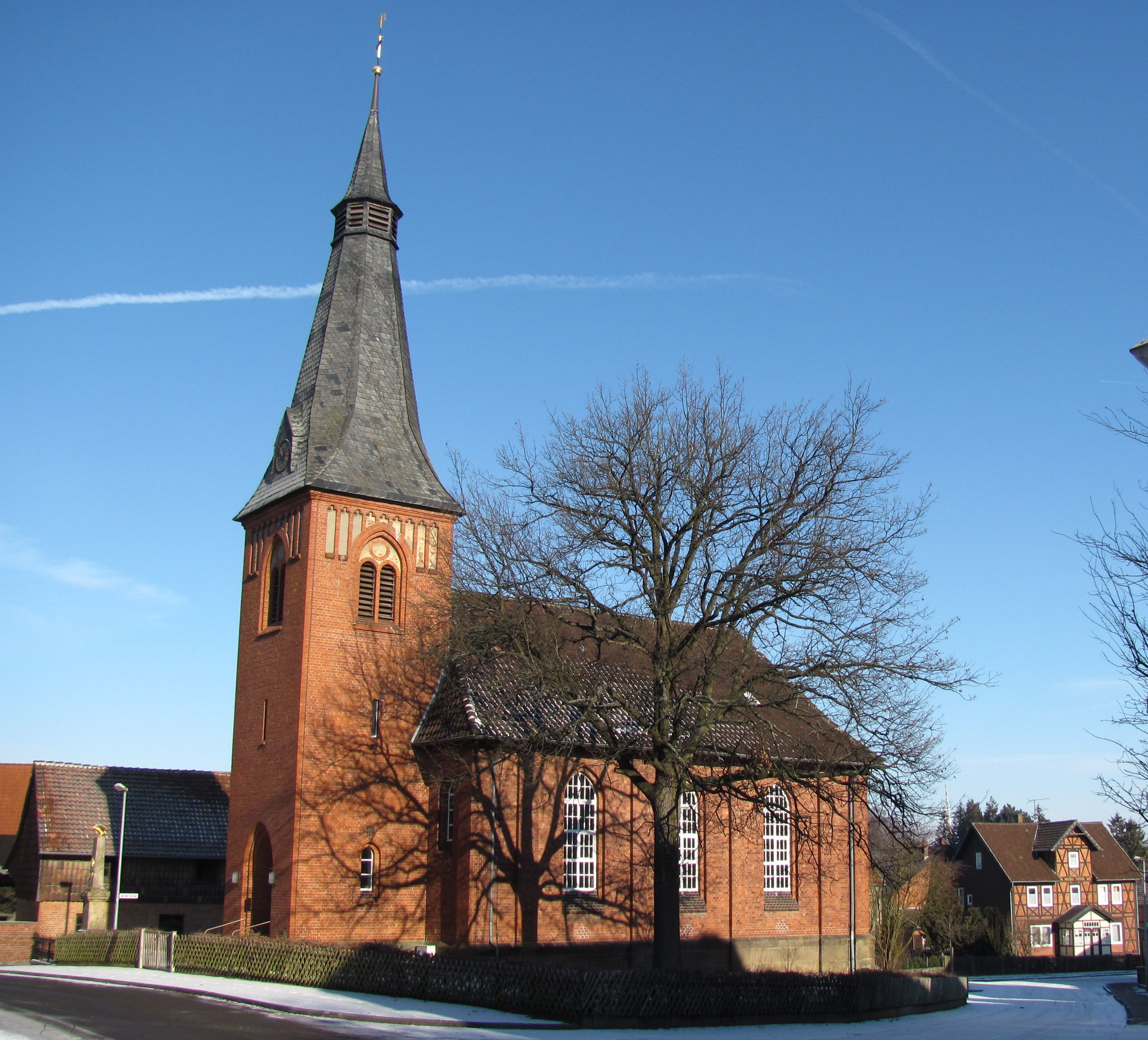
Lutheran St. Matthew's Church, Sillium

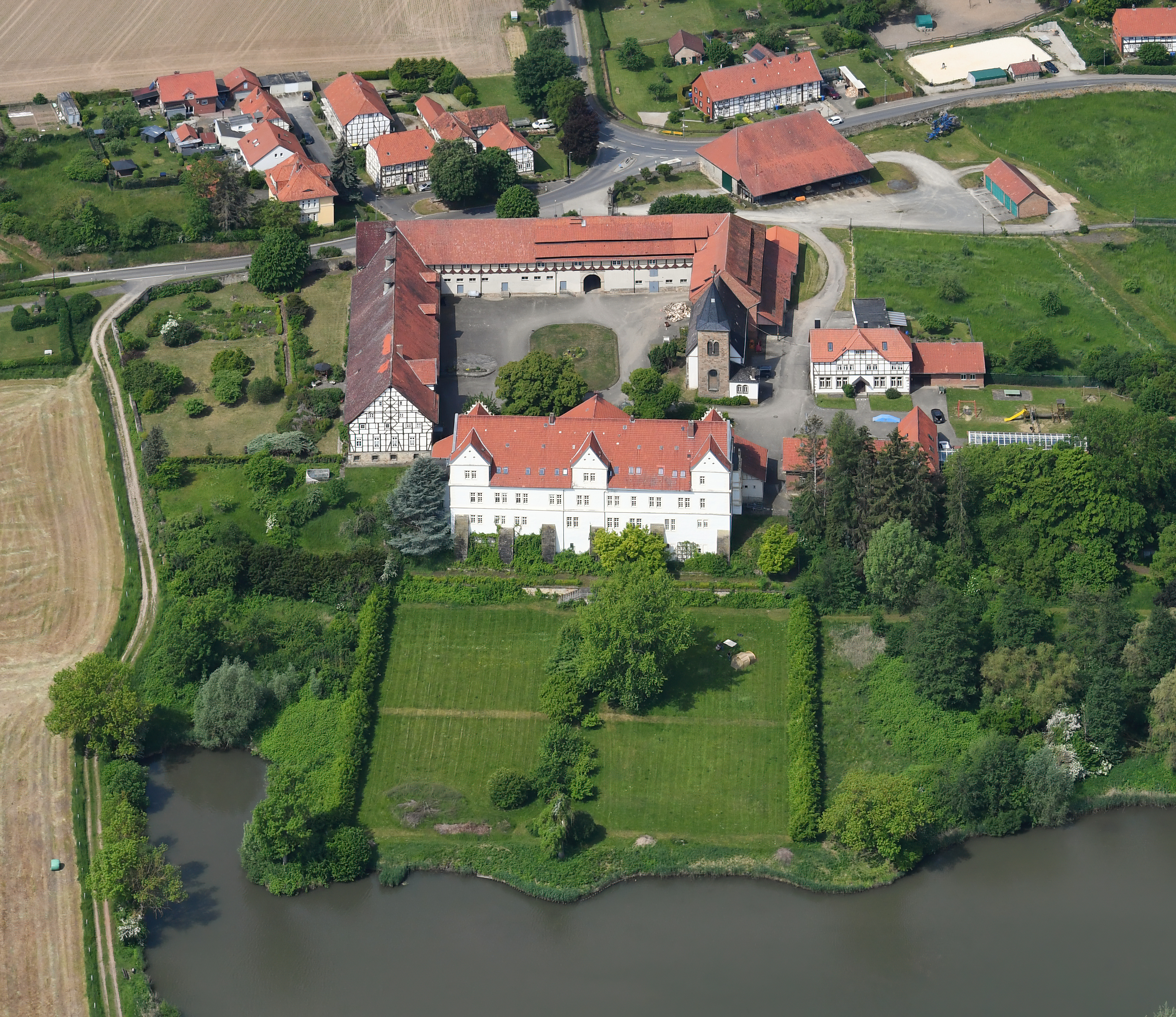
Henneckenrode Castle

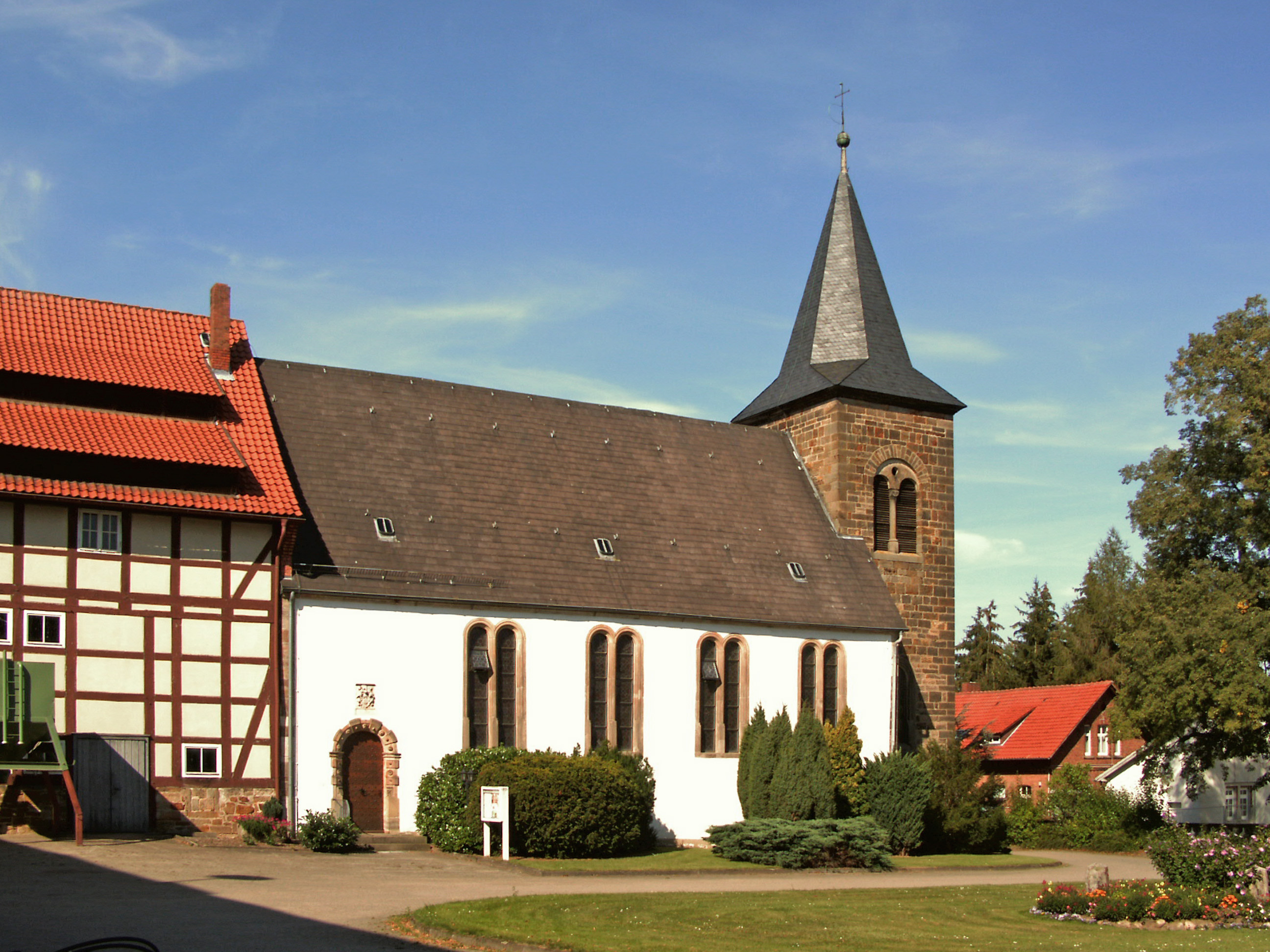
Roman Catholic St. Joseph' s Church near this castle (built in 1597)

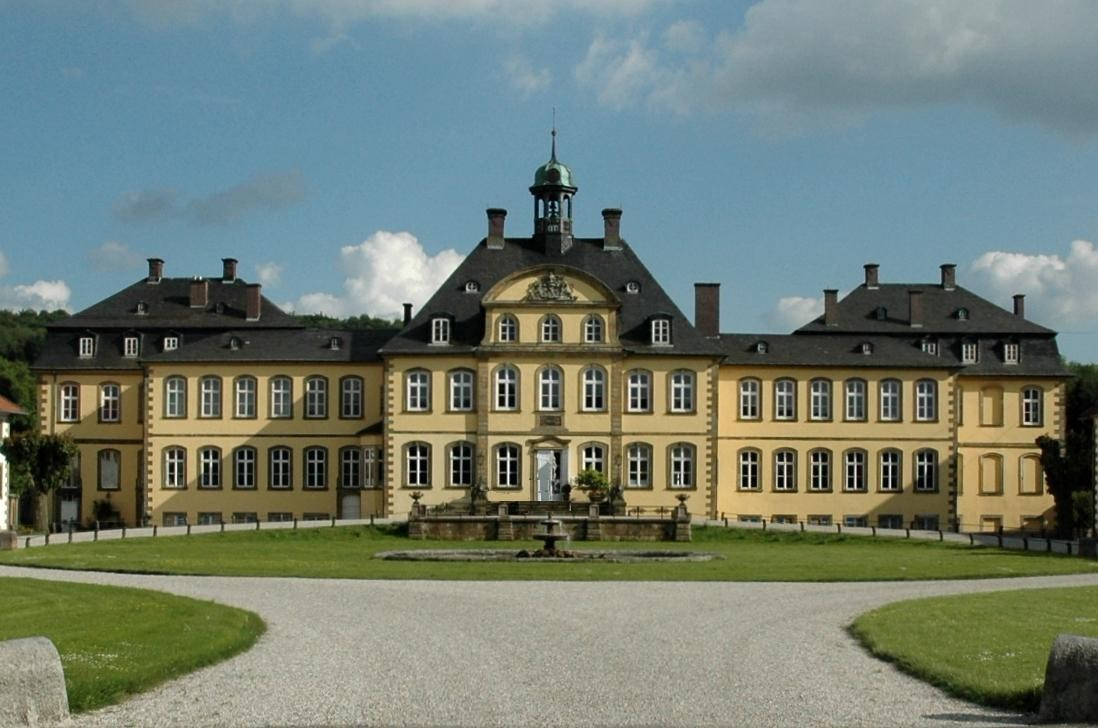
Baroque Söder Castle

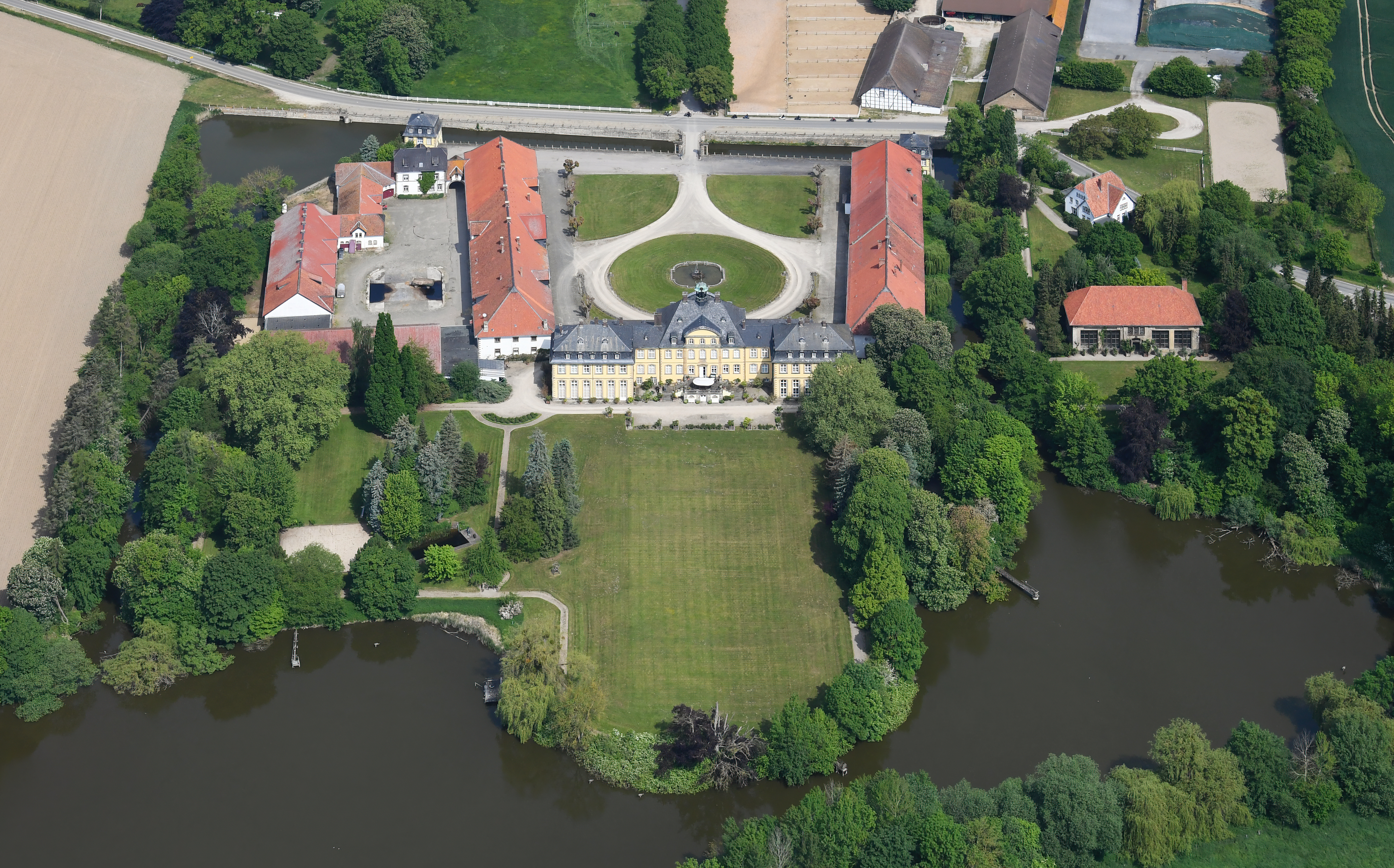
Aerial image of Schloss Söder (view from the south)
