= Düngen =

Düngen may refer to a pair of villages in Lower Saxony, Germany:

- Groß Düngen, in Bad Salzdetfurth
- Klein Düngen, in Bad Salzdetfurth
