= Lamme Valley Railway =

Branch line in Germany

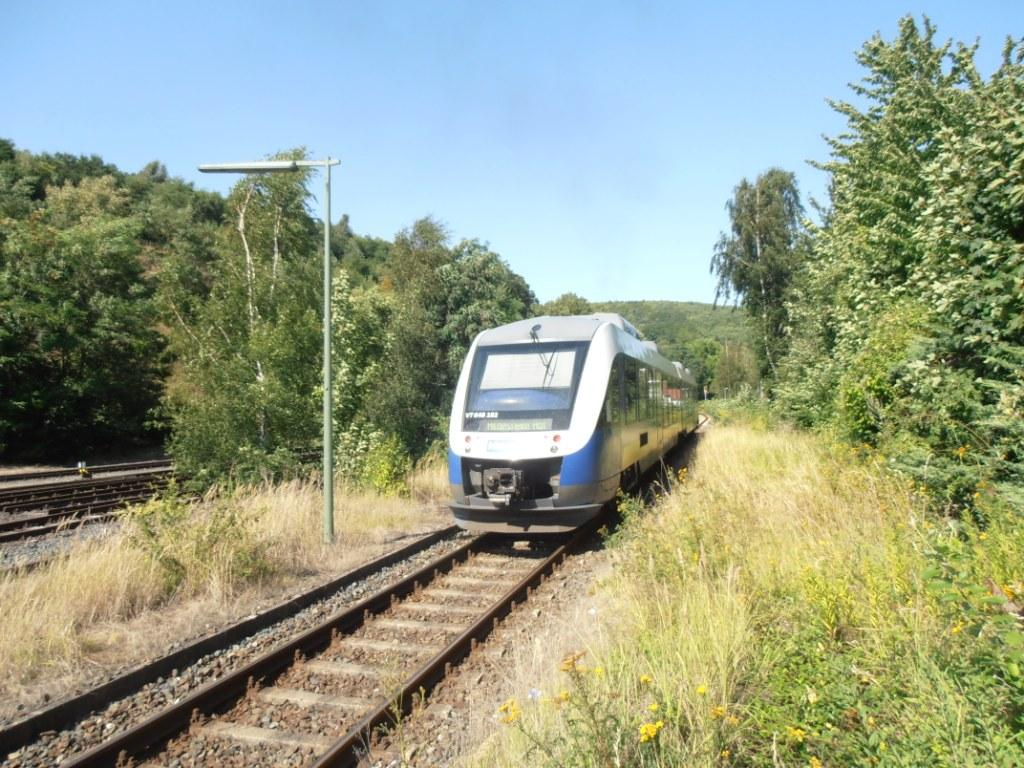
- Train leaving Bad Salzdefurth station (21012)

Overview
- Native name: Lammetalbahn
- Line number: 1822 (Germany)

Service
- Route number: 373

Technical
- Line length: formerly 32 km (20 mi) / 9 km (5.6 mi)
- Track gauge: 1,435 mm (4 ft 8 1/2 in)
- Operating speed: 60 km/h (37 mph) max.

The Lamme Valley Railway (German: Lammetalbahn) is a branch line, that branches off the Hildesheim–Goslar railway in Groß Düngen and continues today via Bad Salzdetfurth to Bodenburg. From there it used to continue via Lamspringe to Bad Gandersheim on the Brunswick–Kreiensen railway.

The surviving section of the railway, which lies wholly within the borough of Bad Salzdetfurth, serves today mainly as a tourist and commuter line. In this area the railway follows the river Lamme, which gave rise to the name of the line.

== History ==
The line was opened between Groß Düngen and Bad Salzdetfurth on 1 October 1900. Wesseln station was opened on 1 November 1901. The extension of the line between Bad Salzdetfurth and Bodenburg followed on 7 November 1901. On the same day, the state railways opened an extension of the Elze–Gronau branch line, in operation since 1 July 1900, to Bodenburg. The extension between Bodenburg and Lamspringe and to Bad Gandersheim was opened on 1 October 1902. Beginning in 1913, battery electric multiple units of the Wittfeld type were used on the line.

On 24 September 1966, the line between Bodenburg and Gronau was closed to passenger traffic. The freight services were closed in two stages, between Sibbesse and Gronau on 17 August 1970, and between Sibbesse and Bodenburg on 25 September 1974. On 27 September 1975, the line was closed to passenger traffic between Bodenburg and Bad Gandersheim, and on 31 May 1980 between Gronau and Elze.

On 1 January 1982, freight traffic ceased between Sehlem and Harbarnsen, on 31 May 1985 the section between Harbarnsen and Lamspringe was closed completely, on 30 May 1987 between Bodenburg and Harbarnsen. What little freight traffic had remained between Lamspringe and Bad Gandersheim (sugar beet, other agricultural goods, and wood) ceased 29 May 1994. Freight traffic on the remaining Gronau–Elze section was also stopped in 1994. Until the late 1980s, some industrial sidings north of Bad Gandersheim were served.

The sections Sehlem–Harbarnsen and Graste–Lamspringe were intersected by the high speed line Hannover–Würzburg. While the construction of Kassemühle bridge west of Sehlem took the existence of the Lamme valley line into account, no overbridge was provided near Lamspringe.

While the remaining section between Groß Düngen and Bodenburg was threatened with closure in the 1980s and 1990s, too, it was spared at the instigation of the federal country and of the town of Salzdetfurth. It was renovated between 2001 and 2003, and a new halt was set up at the salt-water baths (Bad Salzdetfurth Solebad). Wesseln station, closed in 1991, was reopened as a halt in 2003. In order to save expenses on a level crossing, the old Bodenburg station was vacated, and a new halt was opened some 400 m (1,300 ft) east as the new terminus of the line. With a combined platform, if offers easy connections to and from the buses to Bockenem and Bad Gandersheim.

In 2003, the services on the line were taken over by Eurobahn (Keolis), and NordWestBahn took over in December 2011.

== Traffic today ==
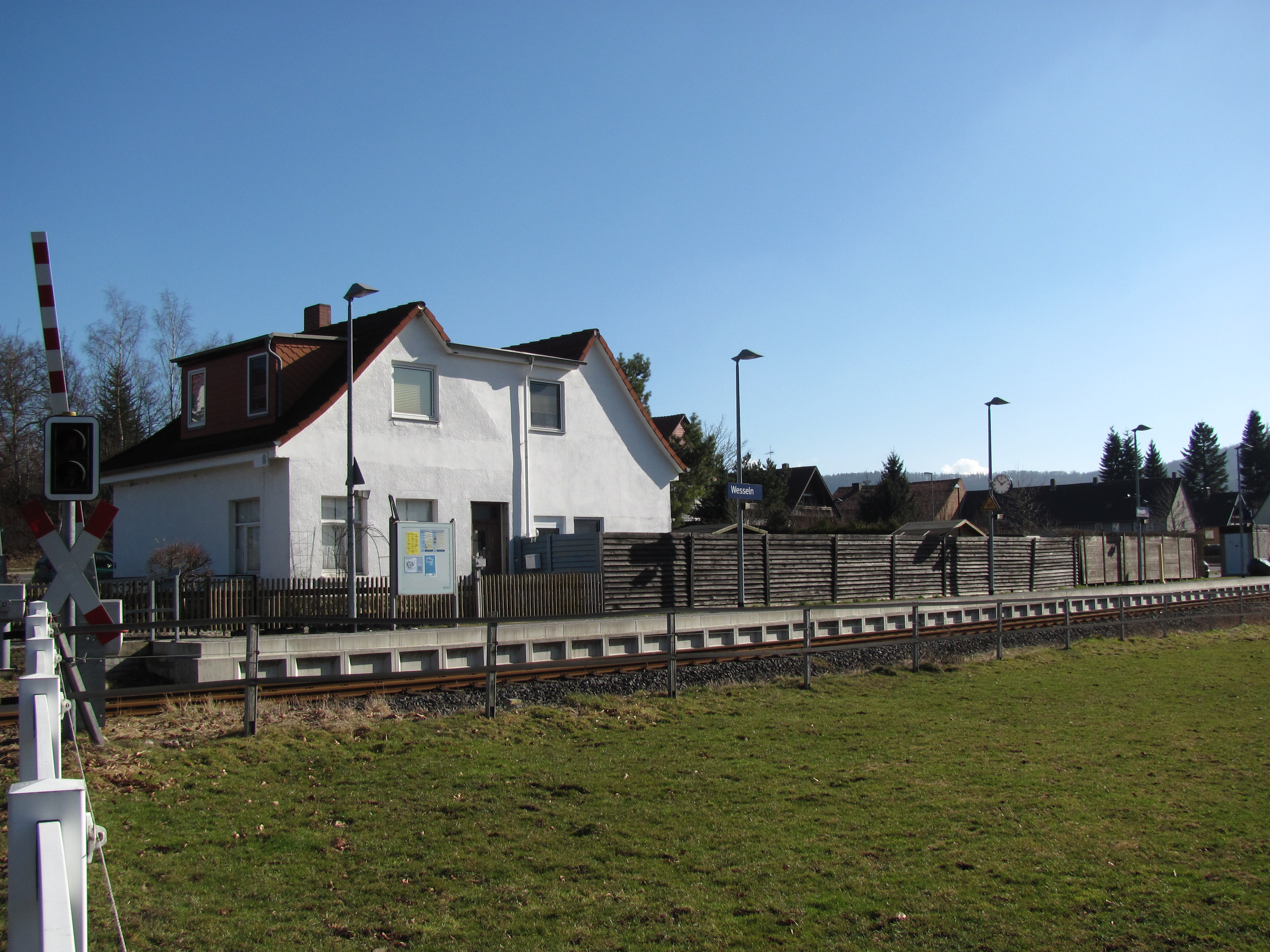
Wesseln halt (2011)

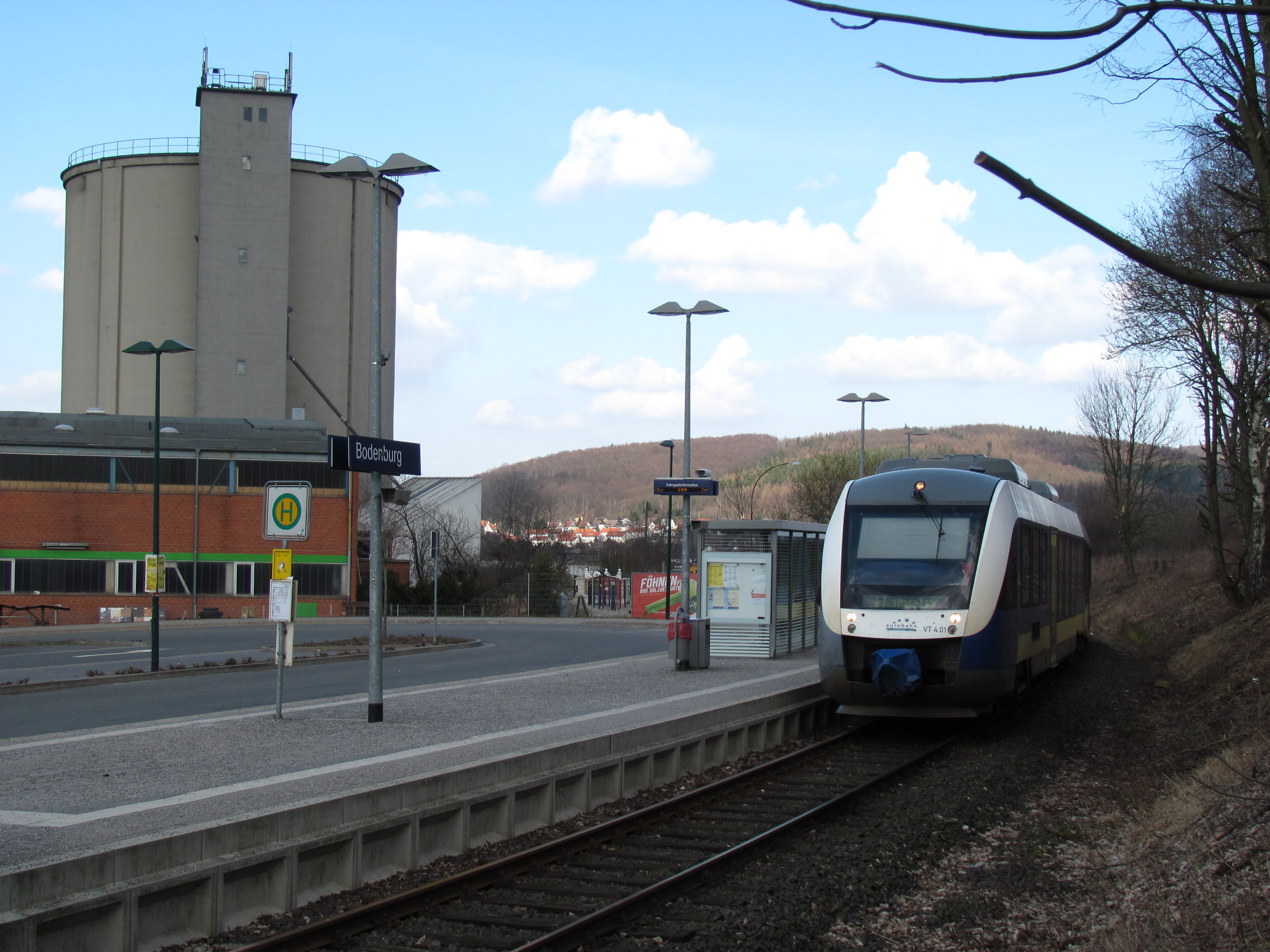
Bodenburg halt (2011)

When Eurobahn took over the passenger service, bus services in the region were changed to offer better connections and less duplication of services. With an increase of publicly ordered rail passenger services to 160%, the number of passenger kilometres increased to 240% until 2006.

Hourly passenger services between Hildesheim and Bodenburg are offered every day except on Sunday mornings. Most trains continue to and from Elze and Hameln via the Elze–Löhne railway. Services on the Lamme valley line are often affected by track works on the Hildeshem–Groß Düngen section. Nordwestbahn has hired LINT DMUs from Landesnahverkehrsgesellschaft Niedersachsen to provide the passenger services.

In 2012, freight traffic between Hildesheim and Bad Salzdetfurth was operated with locomotives of series 261. The trains continue to and from Hannover-Linden marshalling yard via Lehrte and Sehnde.

The Bad Gandersheim–Lamspringe section is nowadays an asphalted foot and cycle path, passing several sculptures and extensive natural hedges on its course through the Heberbörde, an open, hilly stretch of countryside. The two large viaducts in the municipal area of Bad Gandersheim, built around 1900 from quarried stone, are listed as buildings of historical importance.
