= Van Oostrum =

Van Oostrum is a Dutch toponymic surname. Among variant forms are (van) Oosterom and (van) Oostrom. The name usually indicates an origin in the former (10th to 18th century) village Oostrum (from Oosterheem, "eastern settlement") near Houten, Utrecht. Some families may be linked to Oostrum, Friesland or Oostrum (Limburg) instead.

== Variants ==
Notable people with the surname include:

=== Van Oostrum ===
- Devon van Oostrum (born 1993), British-Dutch basketball player, brother of Nigel
- Elsbeth van Oostrom (born 1982), Dutch basketball player
- Job van Oostrum (born 1954), Dutch bobsledder
- Kees van Oostrum (born 1953), Dutch cinematographer
- Martijn van Oostrum (born 1976), Dutch judoka
- Michel van Oostrum (born 1966), Dutch football striker
- Nigel van Oostrum (born 1990), British-Dutch basketball player, brother of Devon

=== Van Oosterom / Oosterum ===
- Niek van Oosterum (born 1974), Dutch classical pianist
- Robert van Oosterom (born 1968), Dutch cricketer
- Joop van Oosterom (1937–2016), Dutch IT entrepreneur, chess sponsor and player

=== (Van) Oostrom ===
- André Oostrom (born 1953), Dutch football midfielder
- Frits van Oostrom (born 1953), Dutch medievalist and literary historian
- John Oostrom (1930–2023), Dutch-born Canadian business executive and parliamentarian
- Leo van Oostrom (born 1942), Dutch saxophonist
- Sander Oostrom (born 1967), Dutch football player
- Soesoe van Oostrom Soede (1911–1939), Dutch swimmer and water polo player

== See also ==
- Oestrum (disambiguation)
- Ostrom (disambiguation)
- Ostrum (disambiguation)
- Simon Jan van Ooststroom (1906–1982), Dutch botanist
