= Ostrum =

Ostrum may refer to:

- Östrum, a village in the southern part of Bad Salzdetfurth in Lower Saxony, Germany
- Ostrum (dragon), a fictional dragon in Dragonaut: The Resonance
- Peter Ostrum (born 1957), American large animal veterinarian and former child actor
- Ostrum Asset Management, a France-based asset manager

== See also ==
- Ostrom (disambiguation)
- Oestrum (disambiguation)
- Van Oostrum
