= Wesseln (Bad Salzdetfurth) =

- Ortsteil of Bad Salzdetfurth
- Interactive map of Wesseln
- Location within Germany Location within Lower Saxony
- Coordinates: 52°04′58″N 10°01′52″E
- Country: Germany
- State: Lower Saxony
- District: Hildesheim
- Town: Bad Salzdetfurth
- Elevation: 98 m (322 ft)

Population (2021)
  - Total: 883
- Time zone: UTC+01:00 (CET)
  - Summer (DST): UTC+02:00 (CEST)
- Postal codes: 31162
- Dialling codes: 05064

Wesseln is a village with a long history in the northern part of the town of Bad Salzdetfurth in Lower Saxony, Germany. It lies on the River Lamme, a tributary of the Innerste. The village has a railway station served by the Lamme Valley Railway.

== History ==
Wesseln was first mentioned in records as Westenem in 1146. Later, the village was also called Westheim. In a document written in 1215, Henricus sacerdote de Westene, the priest of Wesseln, was mentioned as a witness in a trial. In the 16th century, Wesseln ceased to be an independent parish and became part of the parish of nearby Detfurth where the Reformation was not introduced. Originally Protestants were not allowed to settle in Wesseln and Detfurth. Wesseln had a small gothic chapel on the right bank of the Lamme where the priest from Detfurth held regular services. When the number of inhabitants increased in the 19th century, the chapel proved to be too small. A church was built on the left bank of the Lamme in 1853–55, and the old chapel was used as a stable and barn until it burnt down in 1905.

The extraction of potash salt at a mine in Salzdetfurth, which started in 1896, and the inauguration of the Lamme Valley Railway in 1900 promoted the economic growth and industrial development of the village. At the beginning of the 20th century, Wesseln had 388 inhabitants.

In 1974 Wesseln was incorporated into the borough of Bad Salzdetfurth together with several other villages. The railway station was closed in 1991, but reopened in 2003 after the line had been modernized and taken over by a private company.

== Politics ==
The parish chair is held by Burkhard Helfenbein (CDU).

== Sights ==
- St. John Baptist is a small Catholic church with about 60 seats in the village centre. Services are regularly held. It was built of quarrystone in a neogothic style in 1853–55. Its nave has large stained-glass windows set in pointed arches, and a gable roof with a flèche instead of a tower. The small apse in the northern part of the building has a tented roof and a round window. The entrance doorway in the southern part has a pointed arch.
- There are several picturesque half-timbered houses in the village centre.
- A glider airfield is located northwest of the village.
- Wesseln is surrounded by wooded hills offering a scenic view of the village and the Lamme valley. Two noteworthy historic oaks on the Turmberg hill, the 600-year-old Sängereiche and 650-year-old Passeiche, can be reached by footpaths.

== Traffic connections ==
There are good train connections from Hildesheim to Wesseln and to Bad Salzdetfurth with one train per hour on working days and one train at least every two hours on Sundays and public holidays. From the railway station of Wesseln, Bockenem can be reached by bus on working days.

== Gallery ==
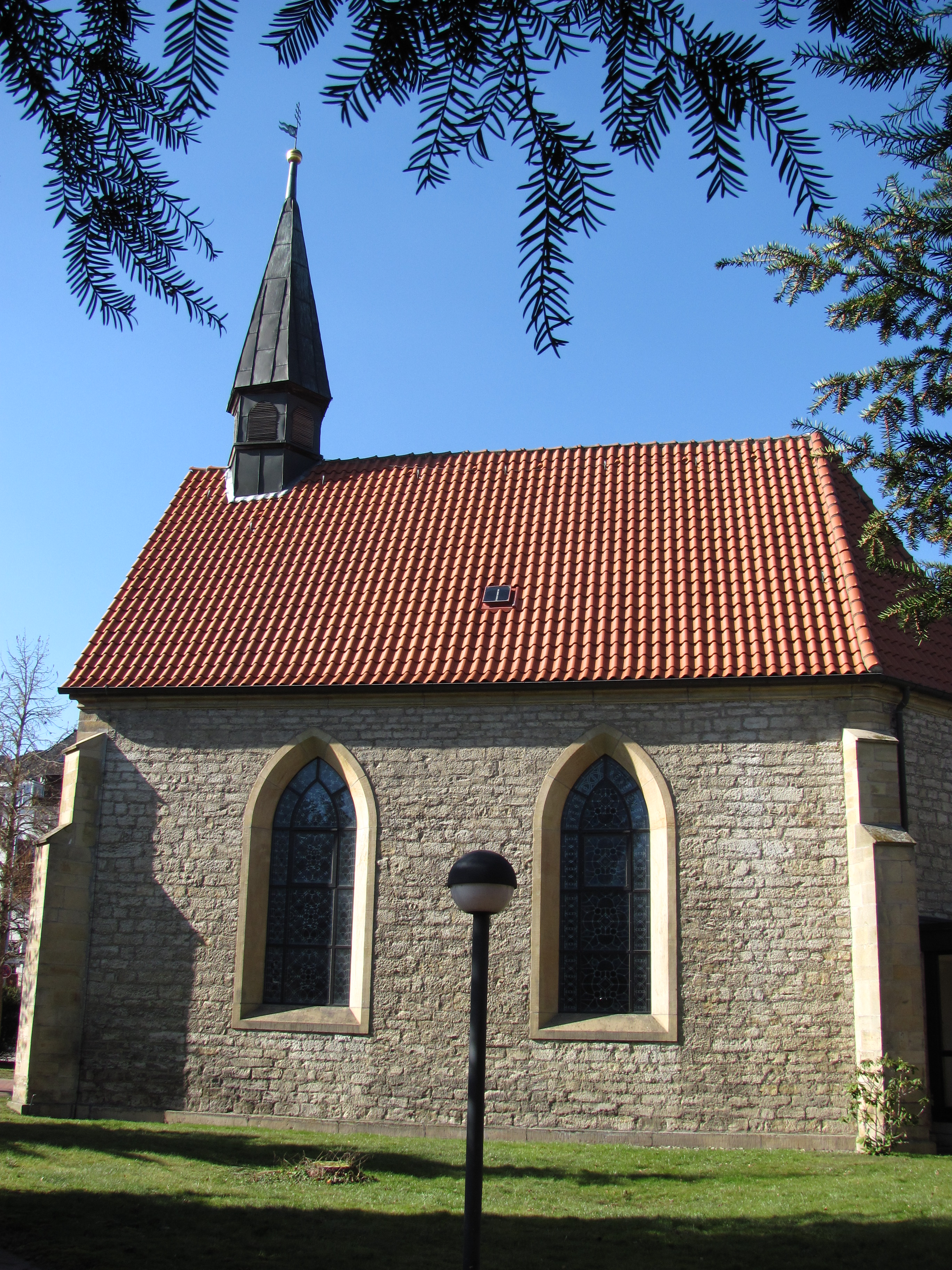
St. John Baptist

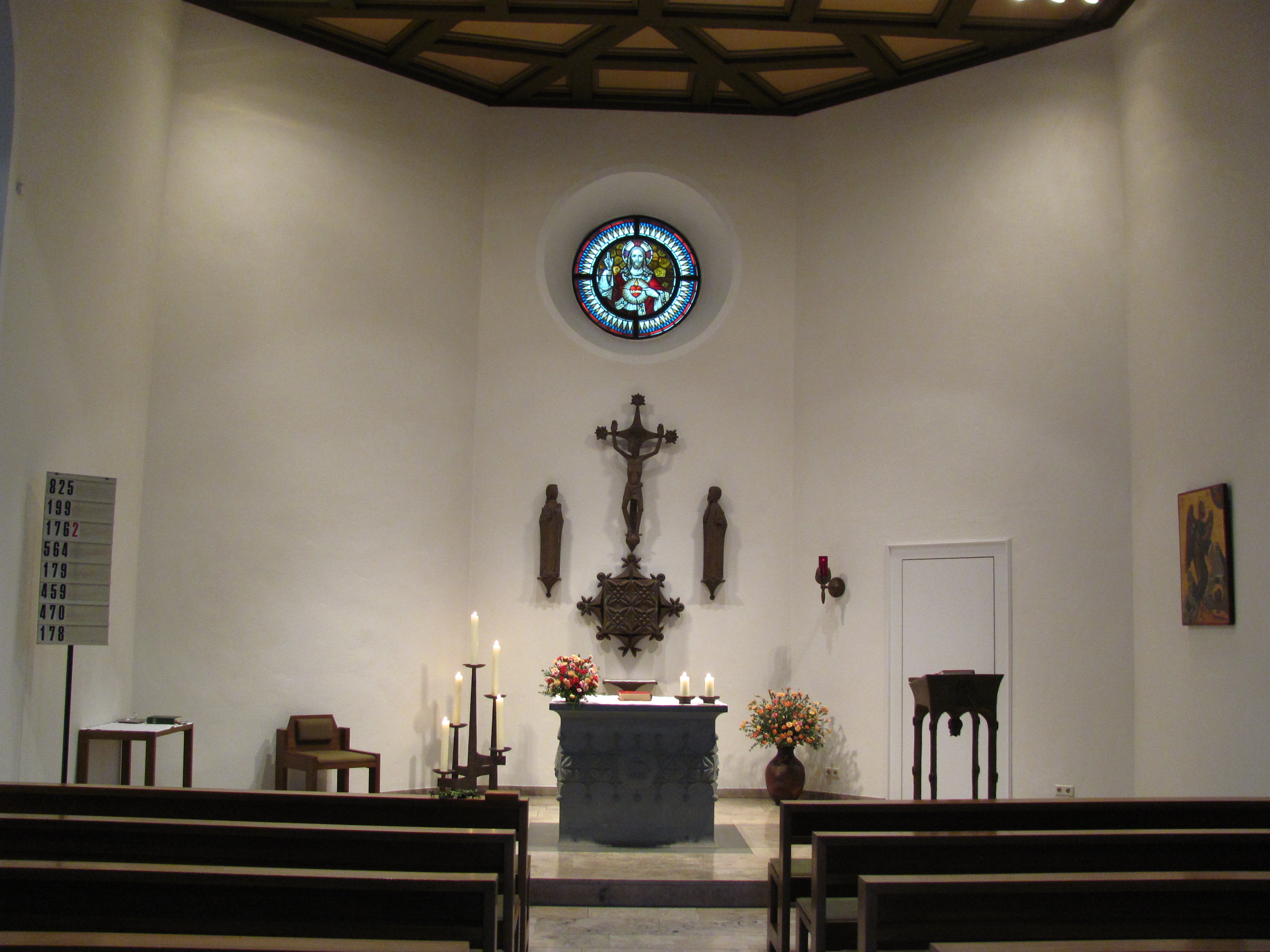
St. John Baptist

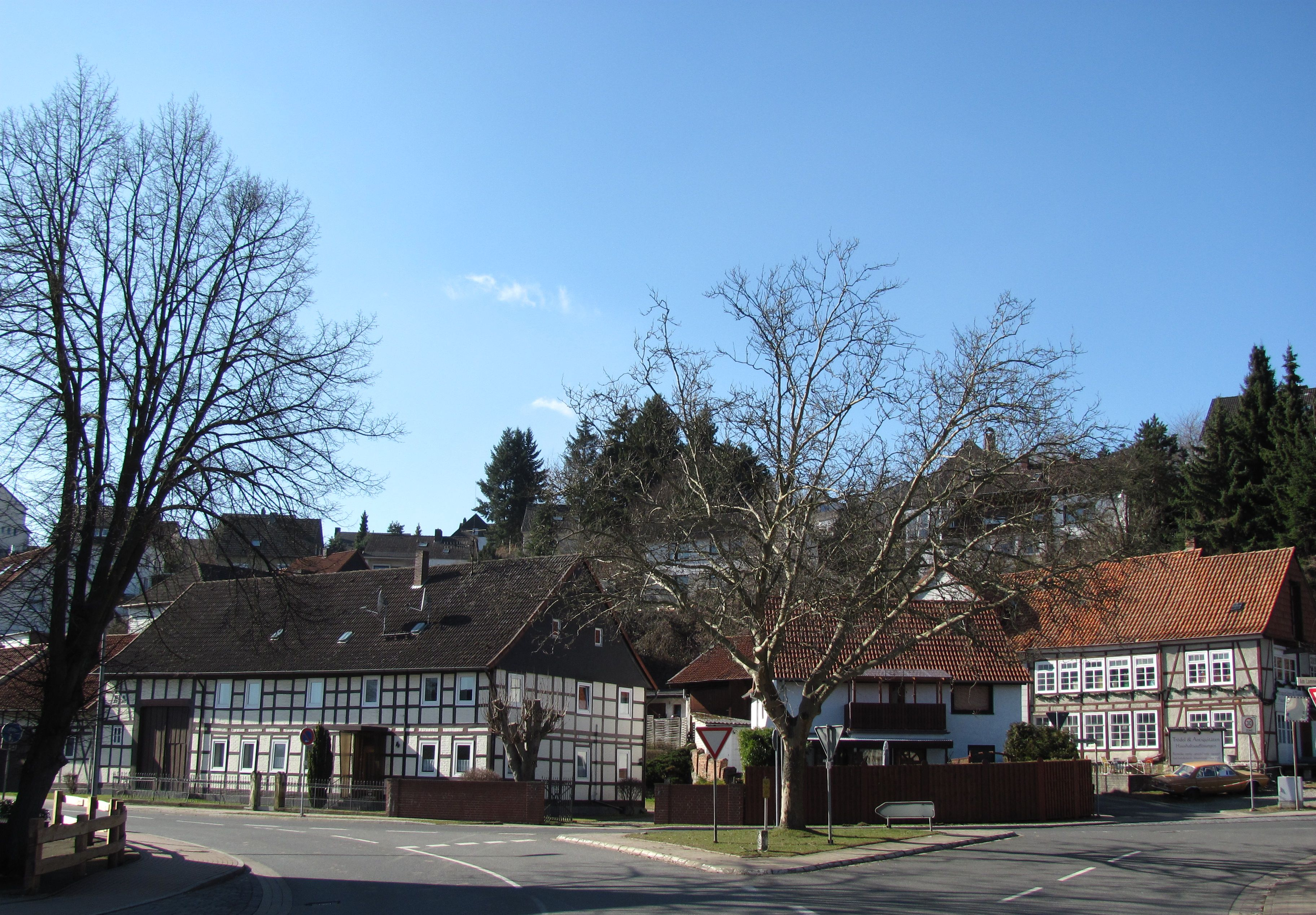
Village centre

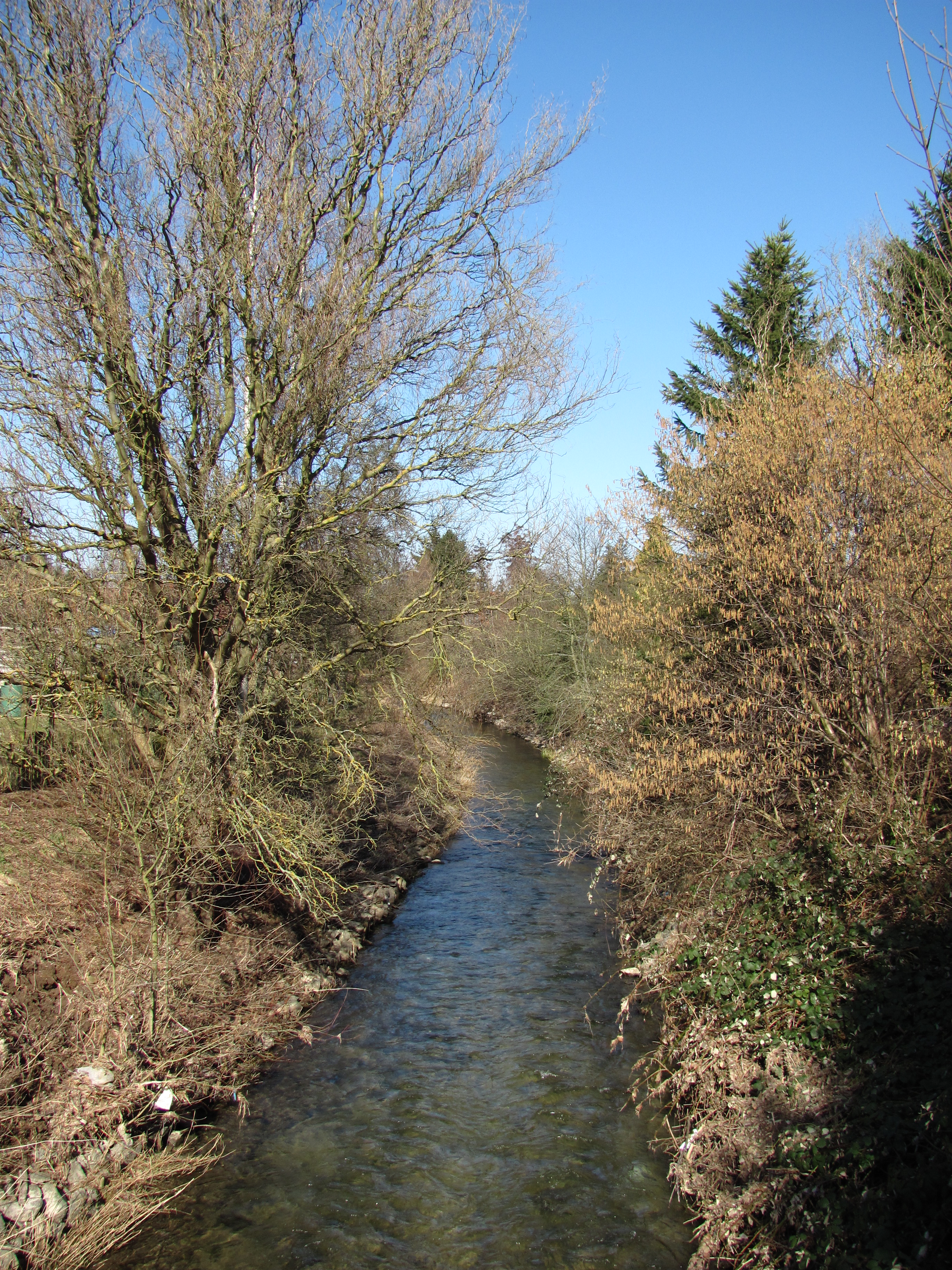
River Lamme

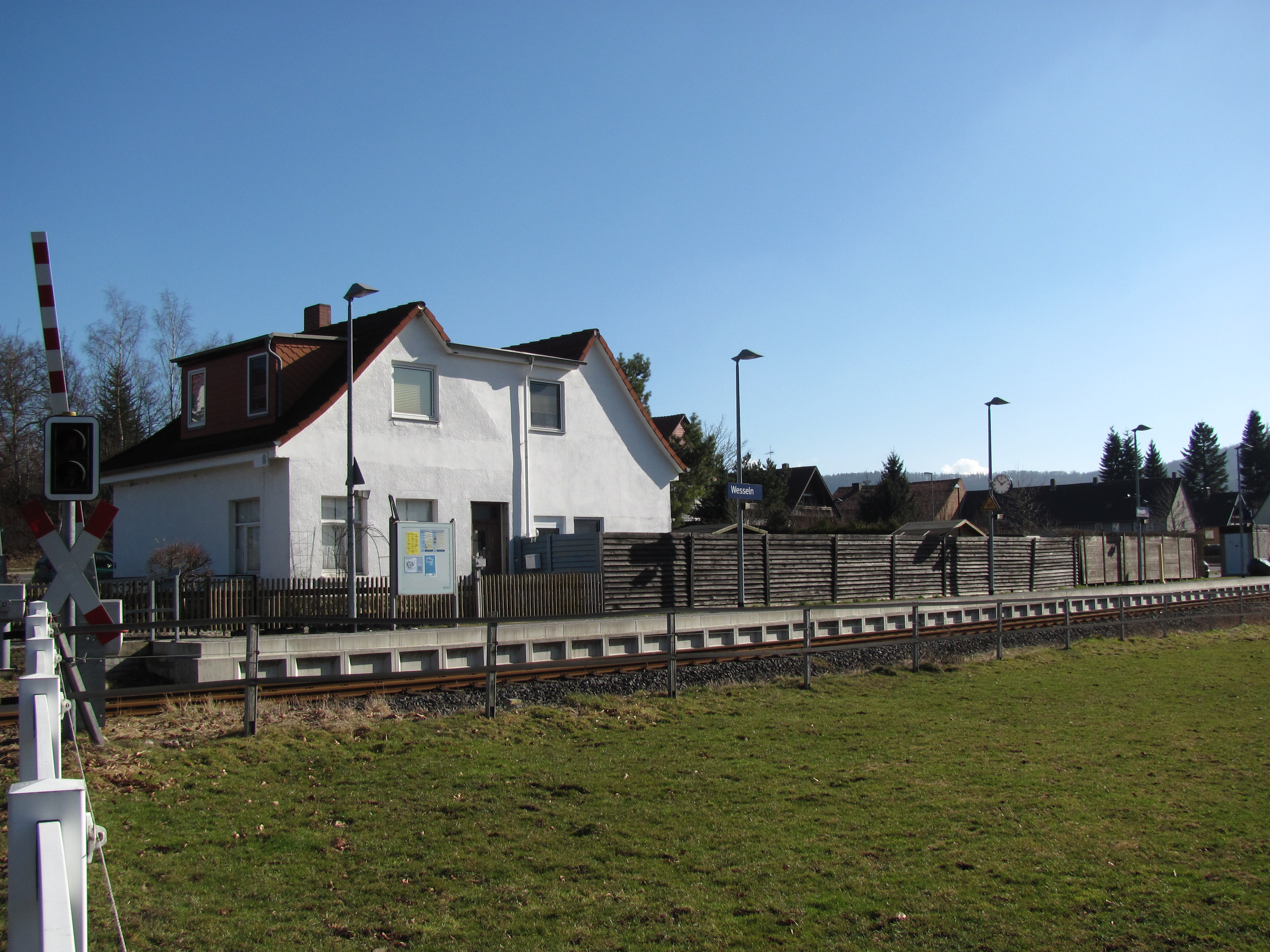
Railway station
