= Klein Düngen =

- Ortsteil of Bad Salzdetfurth
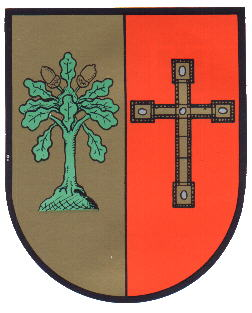
- Coat of arms
- Interactive map of Klein Düngen
- Location within Germany Location within Lower Saxony
- Coordinates: 52°05′39″N 10°02′07″E
- Country: Germany
- State: Lower Saxony
- District: Hildesheim
- Town: Bad Salzdetfurth
- Elevation: 85 m (279 ft)

Population (2021)
  - Total: 371
- Time zone: UTC+01:00 (CET)
  - Summer (DST): UTC+02:00 (CEST)
- Postal codes: 31162
- Dialling codes: 05064

Klein Düngen is a village in the northern part of the town of Bad Salzdetfurth in Lower Saxony, Germany. Klein Düngen is on the river Lamme, a tributary of the River Innerste. The Lamme Valley Railway passes the village, but the nearest railway station is in Groß Düngen, a larger village in the west.

== History ==
Klein Düngen was first mentioned in the records as "Lutteken Dungen" in 1188. In 1974, it was incorporated into the town of Bad Salzdetfurth together with several other villages.

== Politics ==
Parish chair is Alfred Bellgard (CDU).

== Sights ==
- St. Bernward's Chapel is a small catholic chapel in the village centre where services are regularly held. It is named after Bernward, a bishop of Hildesheim who lived 960-1022. Originally, the chapel was called "Visitation Chapel". Whether Klein Düngen has ever had a church is still unknown as in the documents referring to the village there is no church mentioned. The foundations of St. Bernward's Chapel possibly date from the 13th century. The chapel has several firing slits suggesting that it might have been used as a fortified church. Its walls are comparatively thick. The main entrance consisting of a gothic arch is in the West of the building. The chapel which has a flèche instead of a tower was renovated in 1701, 1954/55, 1978, 1986 and 1993. In the chapel, there is a remarkable statue representing Saint Bernward holding a Bernward Cross in his hand. The golden Bernward Cross which was made about 1130 is one of the most famous items in the museum of the Cathedral of Hildesheim. The windows of the St. Bernward's Chapel are rather small in comparison to the windows of other chapels and churches. Some of them are easily recognizable as former firing slits. The chapel has about 40 seats.
- In the high street, a tall stone cross with a carved inscription dating from 1853 is noteworthy.
- There are several well-preserved half-timbered houses in the village centre.

== Gallery ==
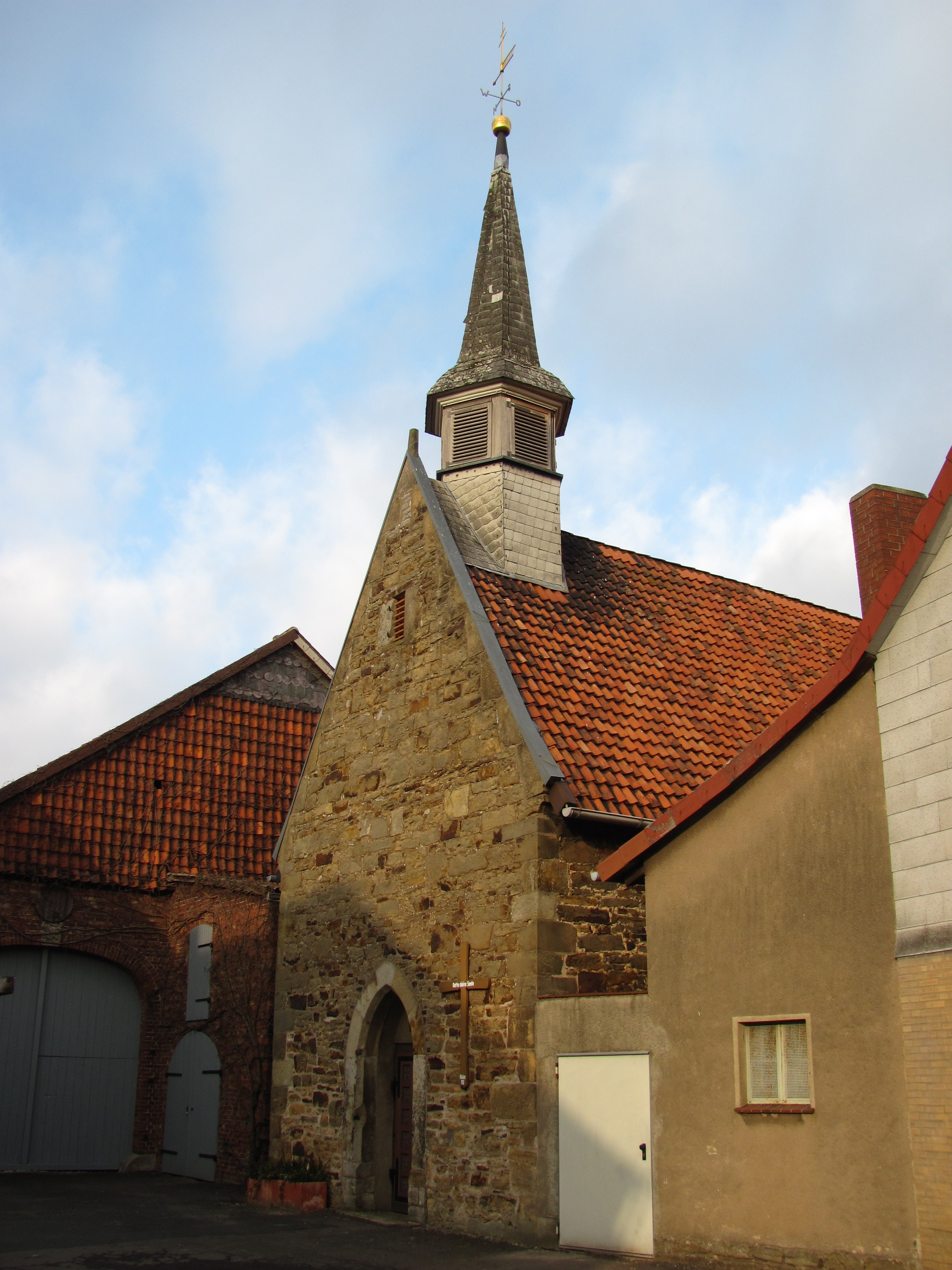
St. Bernward's Chapel

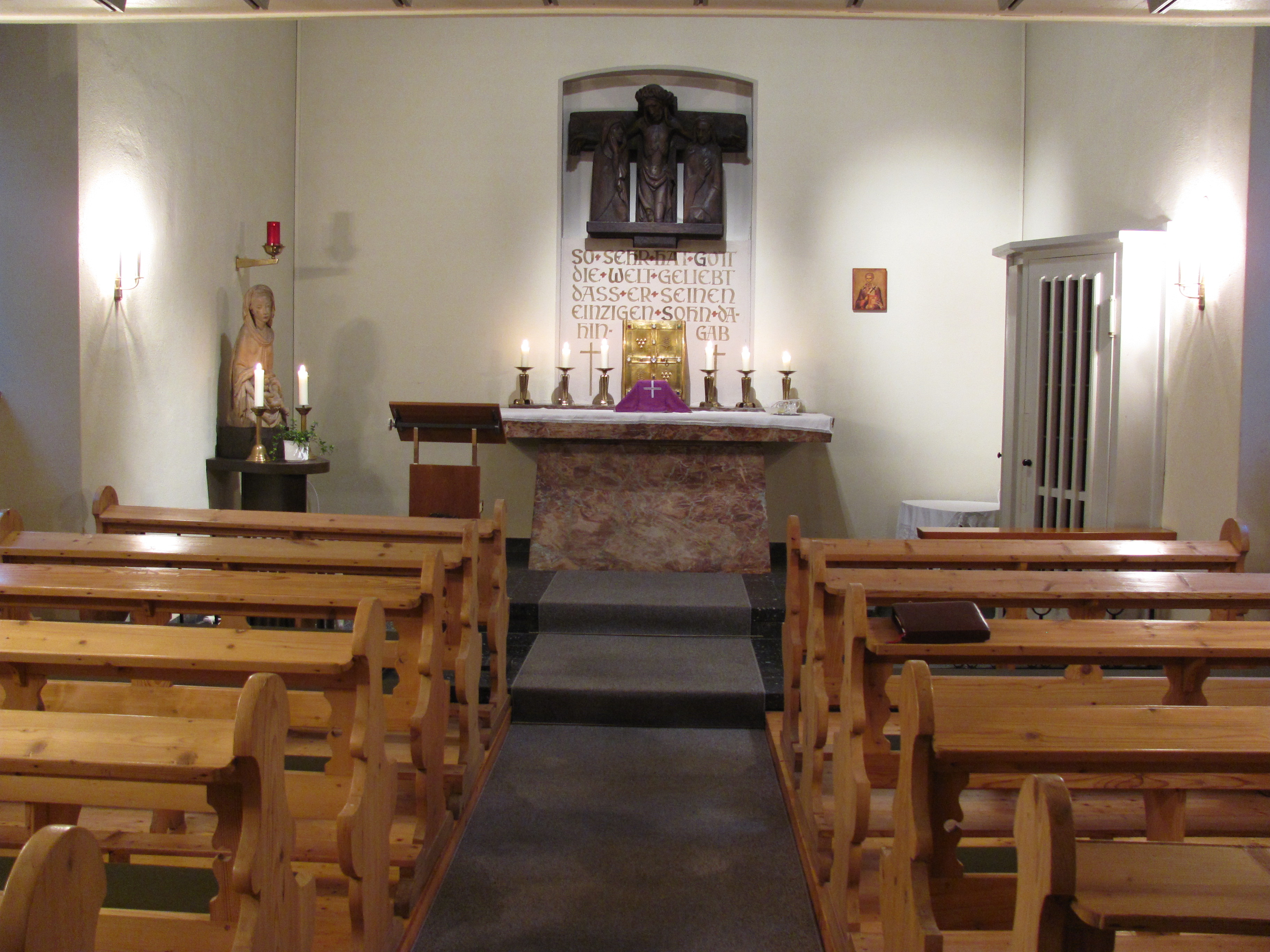
St. Bernward's Chapel

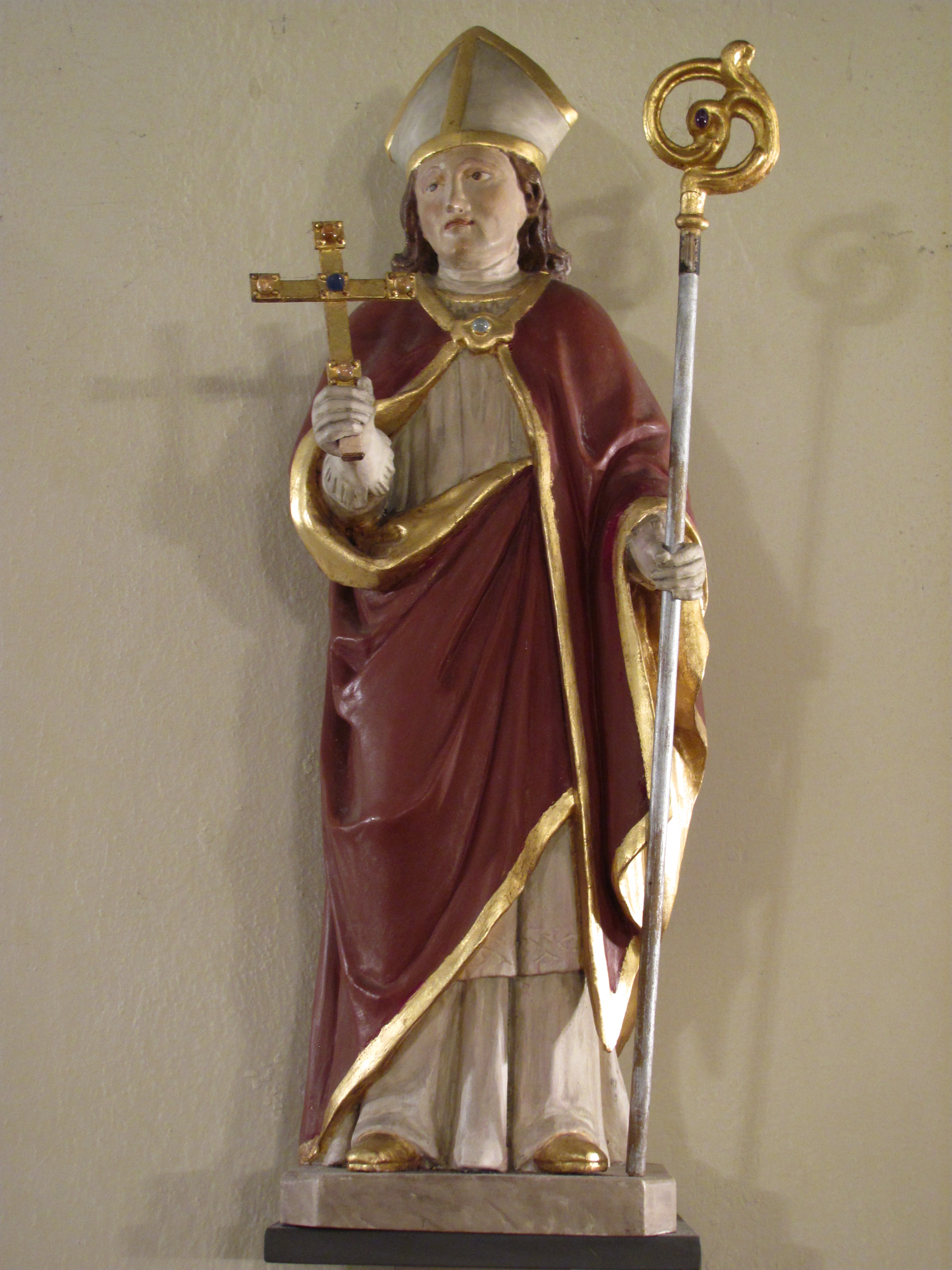
Statue of Saint Bernward

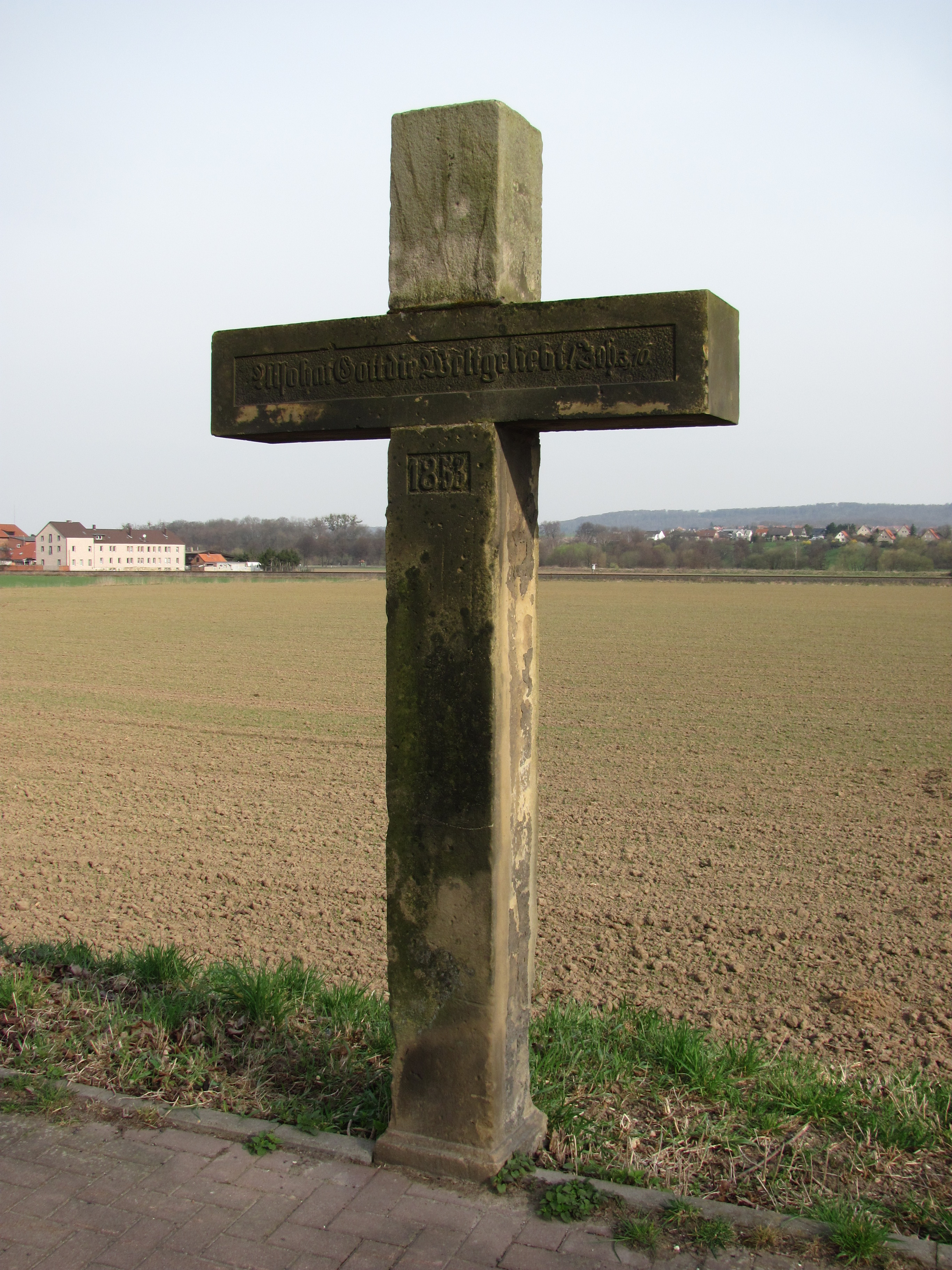
Stone cross (1853) in the high street

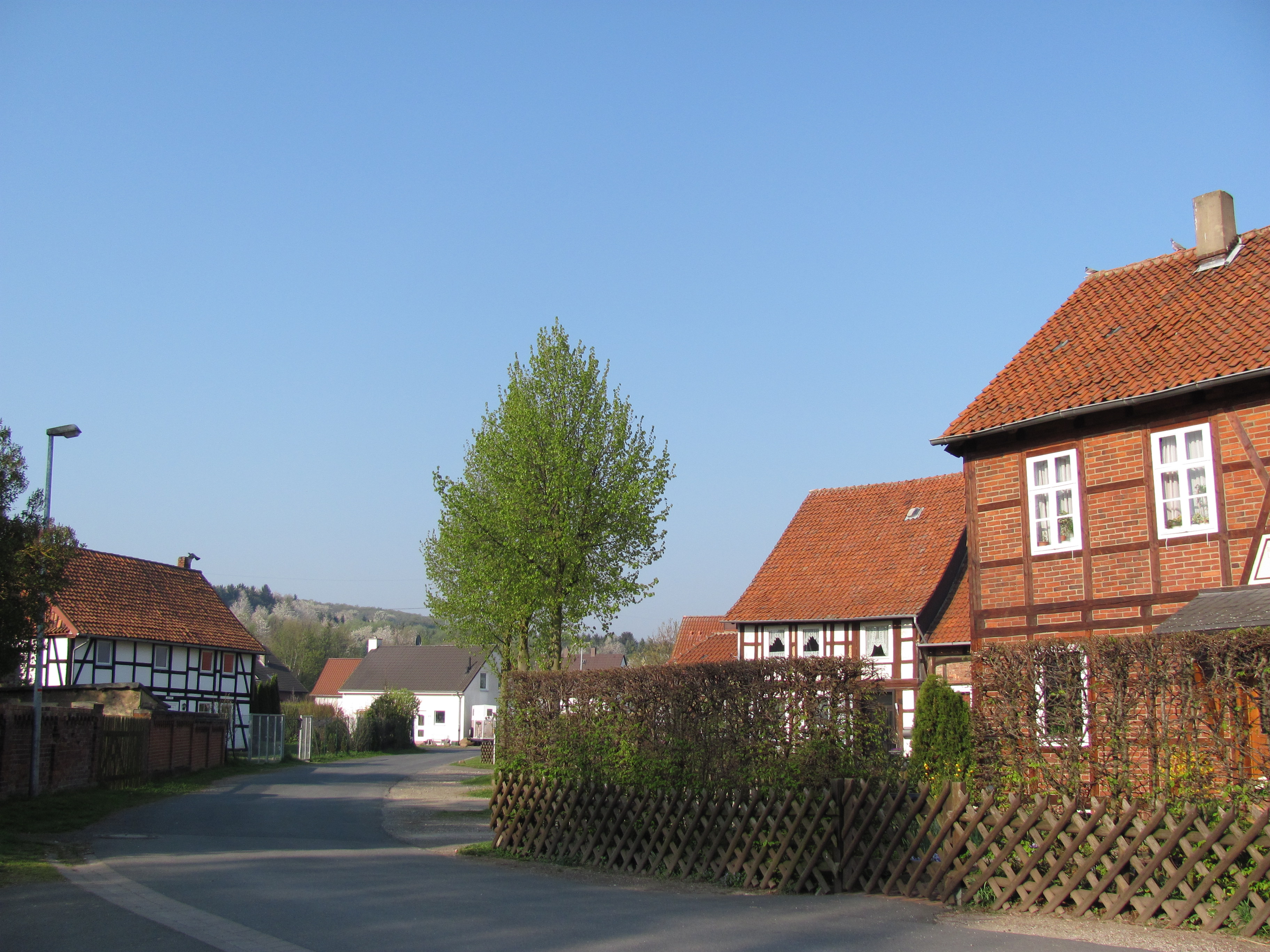
Village centre

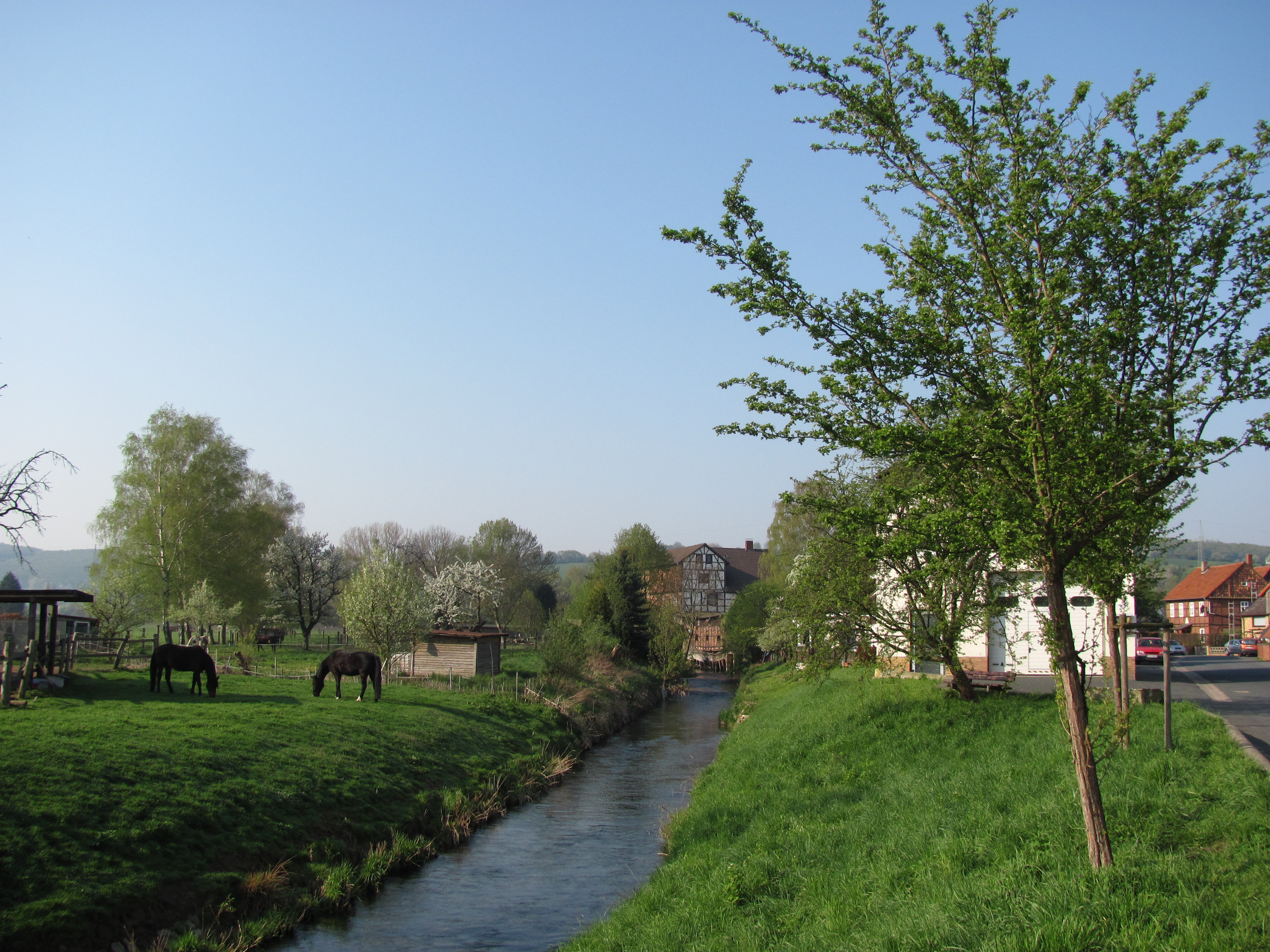
River Lamme
