= Listringen =

Coordinates: 52°6′N 10°04′E

Coat of arms

Listringen is a village of the municipality Bad Salzdetfurth in the district of Hildesheim, in Lower Saxony, Germany. It is situated approximately 9 km south of Hildesheim.
