= Ostrom =

Ostrom or Öström is a Swedish surname meaning "island stream".

== History ==
Many of the Ostroms in North America are descendants of a Dutch immigrant to New Amsterdam in the 1600s. The name was van Oosteroom and originated in the area of Utrecht and several unrelated families used this name.

== People with the surname ==
Notable people with the surname include:

- Elinor Ostrom (1933–2012), American political economist
- Ellen Ostrom, former dancer in the New York City Ballet's corps de ballet
- Gilbert Wellington Ostrom (1837–1917), Ontario lawyer and political figure
- Hans Ostrom (born 1954), American professor, writer, editor, and scholar
- John Ostrom (1928–2005), American paleontologist
- Magnus Öström, drummer for the Esbjörn Svensson Trio
- Meredith Ostrom (born 1977), American actress, model, and painter
- Tom Ostrom (1936–1994), American psychologist
- Vincent Ostrom (1919–2012), American political scientist
- Walter Ostrom, ceramic artist

== See also ==
- Ostrum (disambiguation)
- Oestrum (disambiguation)
- Van Oostrum
