= Bad Salzdetfurth =

- Town
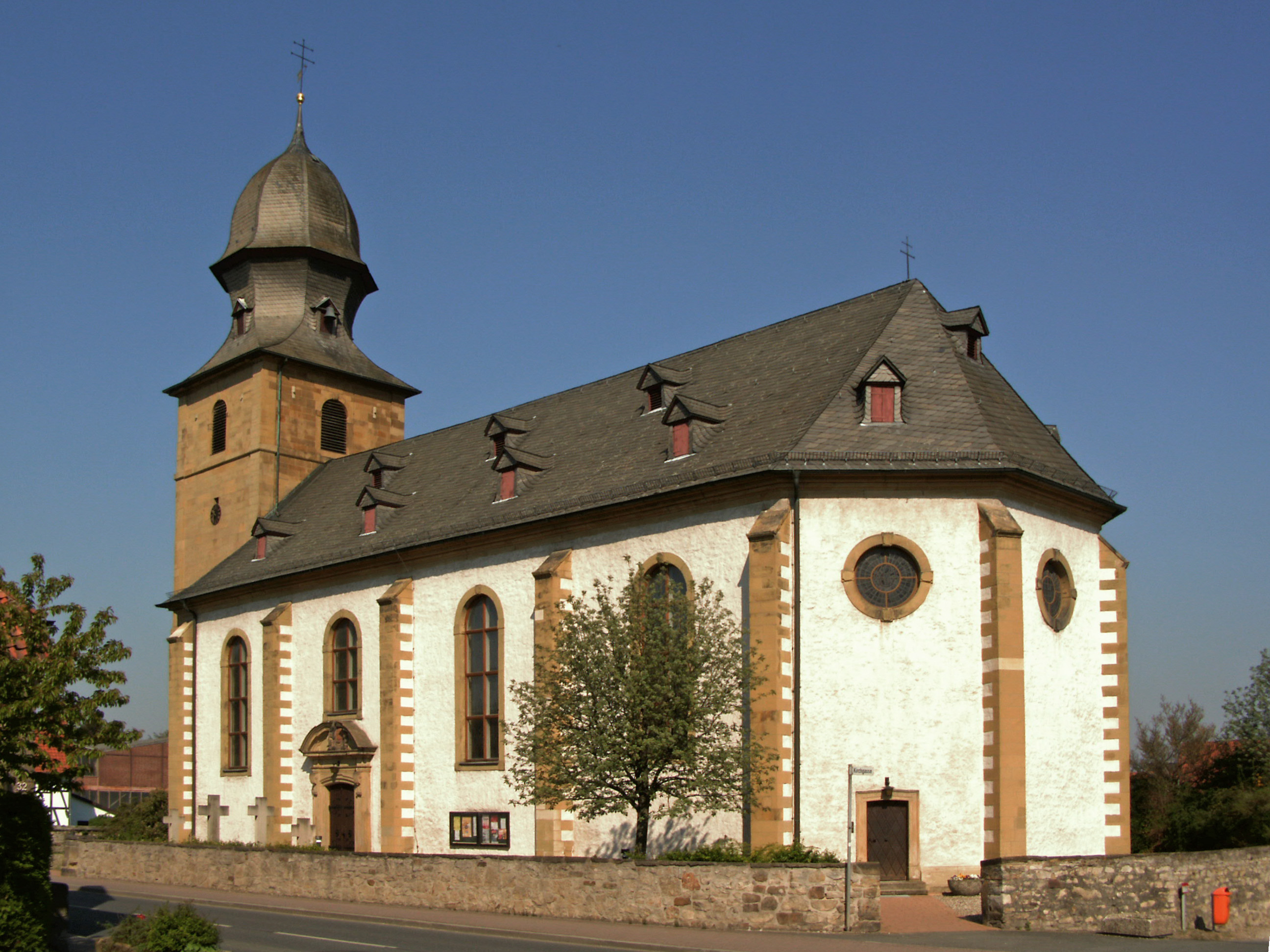
- St. Cosmas and Damian Catholic Church, Groß Düngen

- Coat of arms

- Location of Bad Salzdetfurth within Hildesheim district
- Interactive map of Bad Salzdetfurth
- Location within Germany Location within Lower Saxony
- Coordinates: 52°03′55″N 10°00′33″E
- Country: Germany
- State: Lower Saxony
- District: Hildesheim

Government
  - Mayor (2019–24): Björn Gryschka (Ind.)

Area
  - Total: 67.2 km^{2} (25.9 sq mi)
- Elevation: 118 m (387 ft)

Population (2025-12-31)
  - Total: 12,970
  - Density: 193/km^{2} (500/sq mi)
- Time zone: UTC+01:00 (CET)
  - Summer (DST): UTC+02:00 (CEST)
- Postal codes: 31162
- Dialling codes: 05063
- Vehicle registration: HI
- Website: www.bad-salzdetfurth.de

Bad Salzdetfurth (German pronunciation: [baːt zaltsˈdɛtfʊʁt]) is a town on the banks of the River Lamme in the district of Hildesheim, in Lower Saxony, Germany.

== Geography ==
The municipality includes the town itself, and 12 civil parishes (Ortsteile) which were incorporated in 1974:

- Bodenburg
- Breinum
- Detfurth
- Groß Düngen
- Klein Düngen
- Heinde
- Hockeln
- Lechstedt
- Listringen
- Östrum
- Wehrstedt
- Wesseln (Bad Salzdetfurth)

== History ==
In 1194, Salzdetfurth was mentioned in a document for the first time. The place was devastated by fire or flood several times. The worst flood occurred in 1738 when 176 houses were destroyed. The word "Bad" meaning "spa" was added to the name in 1921. On 22 March 1945, during a heavy air raid on Hildesheim, Bad Salzderfurth was hit by several bombs and two houses in Goettingstrasse were destroyed. Bad Salzdetfurth was officially awarded "town" status in 1949.

Each of the villages incorporated in 1974 has its own history and its own traditions.

== Mayors ==
Björn Gryschka (independent politician) was elected the new mayor in January 2019, succeeding Henning Hesse (SPD).

== Sights ==
There are various sights in the town itself and in each of the villages. There are many well-preserved half-timbered houses in the old town centre, such as the Miners' Guild Hall dating from 1898, and in the village of Wesseln. The Catholic Church of St. Gallus at Detfurth was built in a classicist style in the period 1772 to 1779. Other interesting village churches and chapels can be seen in Hockeln, Bodenburg, Breinum, Östrum, Wehrstedt and Klein Düngen. The Church of St. John the Baptist in Wesseln was built in a typical neogothic style in 1853-55.

The largest church in Bad Salzdetfurth itself is St. George's Church, a Protestant church with a painted wooden ceiling, which was built around 1700. In the west wall a mark, which is 3 metres above ground level, indicates the height of the flood waters of the River Lamme in 1738. The baroque altar dates from 1717. The organ, dating from 1590, originally stood in St. Lamberti, Hildesheim. There is a municipal museum dedicated to the mining history of Bad Salzdetfurth. Originally the brick building which now houses the museum was a school. The museum was founded in 1987.

The most modern church in Bad Salzdetfurth is the Catholic Holy Family Church which was built 1960-61 and consecrated on 3 September 1961. Its organ dates from 1979. Originally, very few Catholics lived in Bad Salzdetfurth. After the Second World War, however, many Catholic refugees from Silesia settled in the town.

== Traffic connections ==
Bad Salzdetfurth can be reached from Hildesheim by train. The railway station is in the middle of the town. There are railway halting places in the villages Bodenburg, Detfurth, Wesseln and Groß Düngen as well. On working days, there is at least one train per hour to and from Hildesheim. On Sundays and public holidays there is one train every two hours.

== Photogallery ==
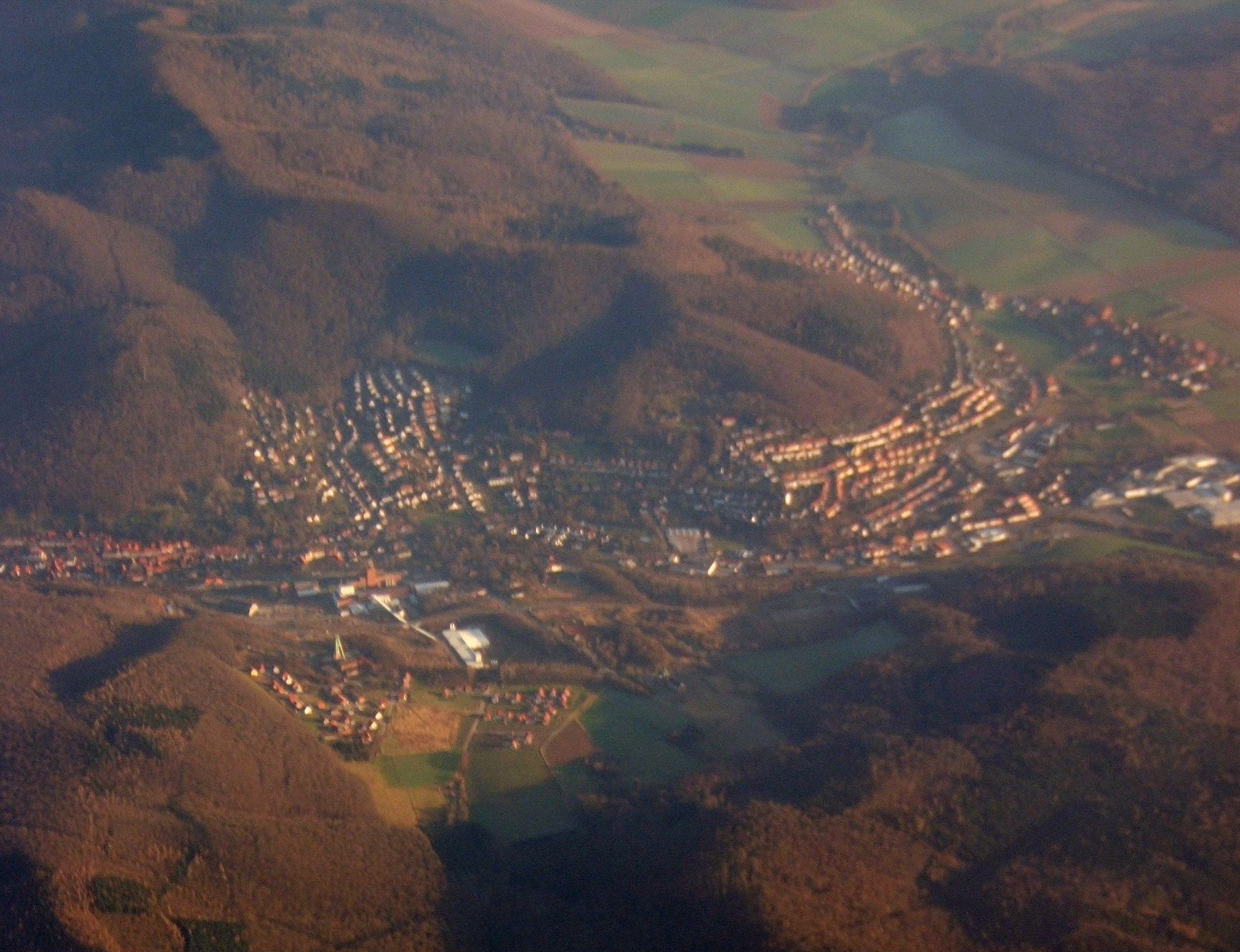
Aerial view

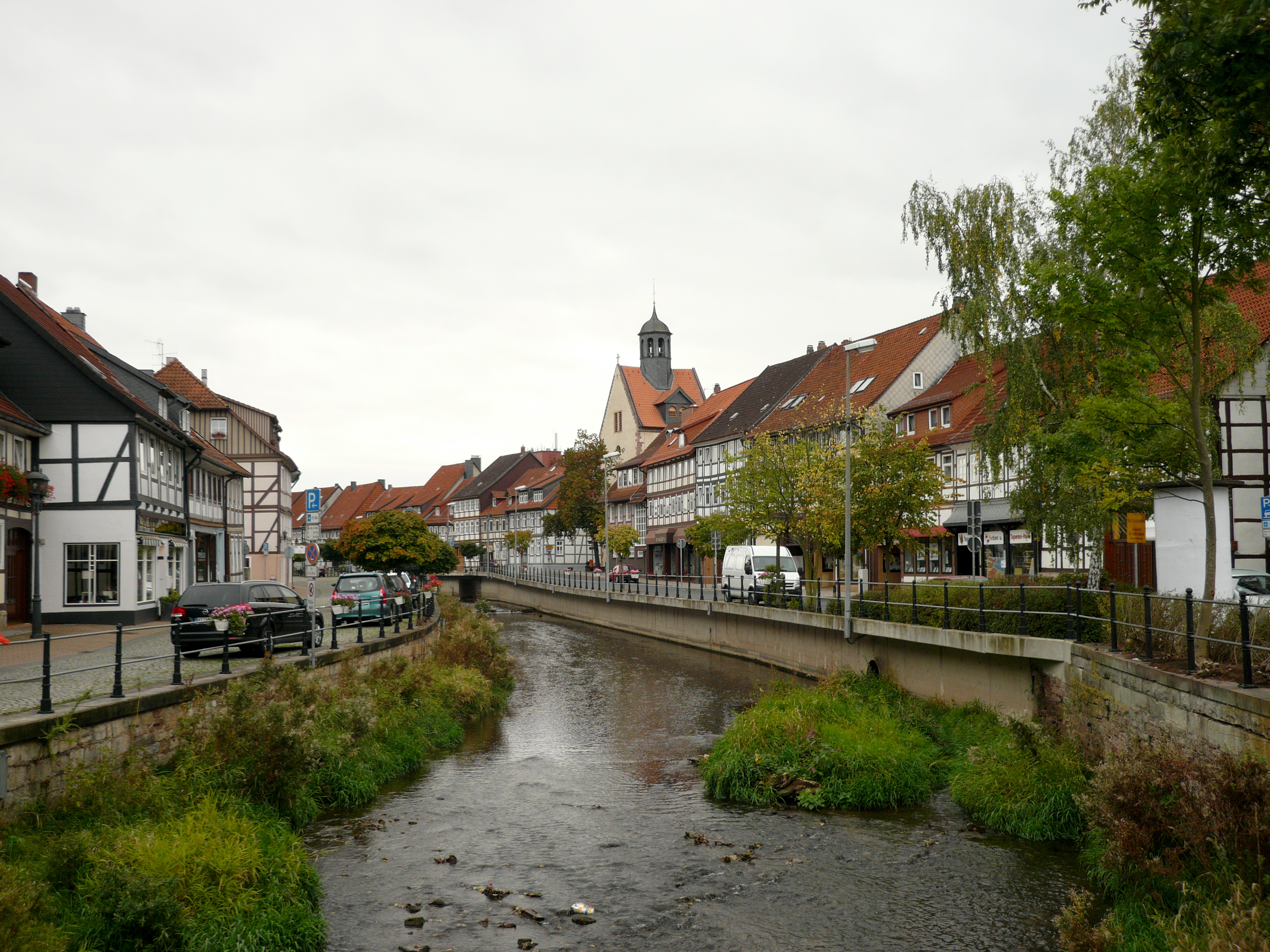
River Lamme and town centre

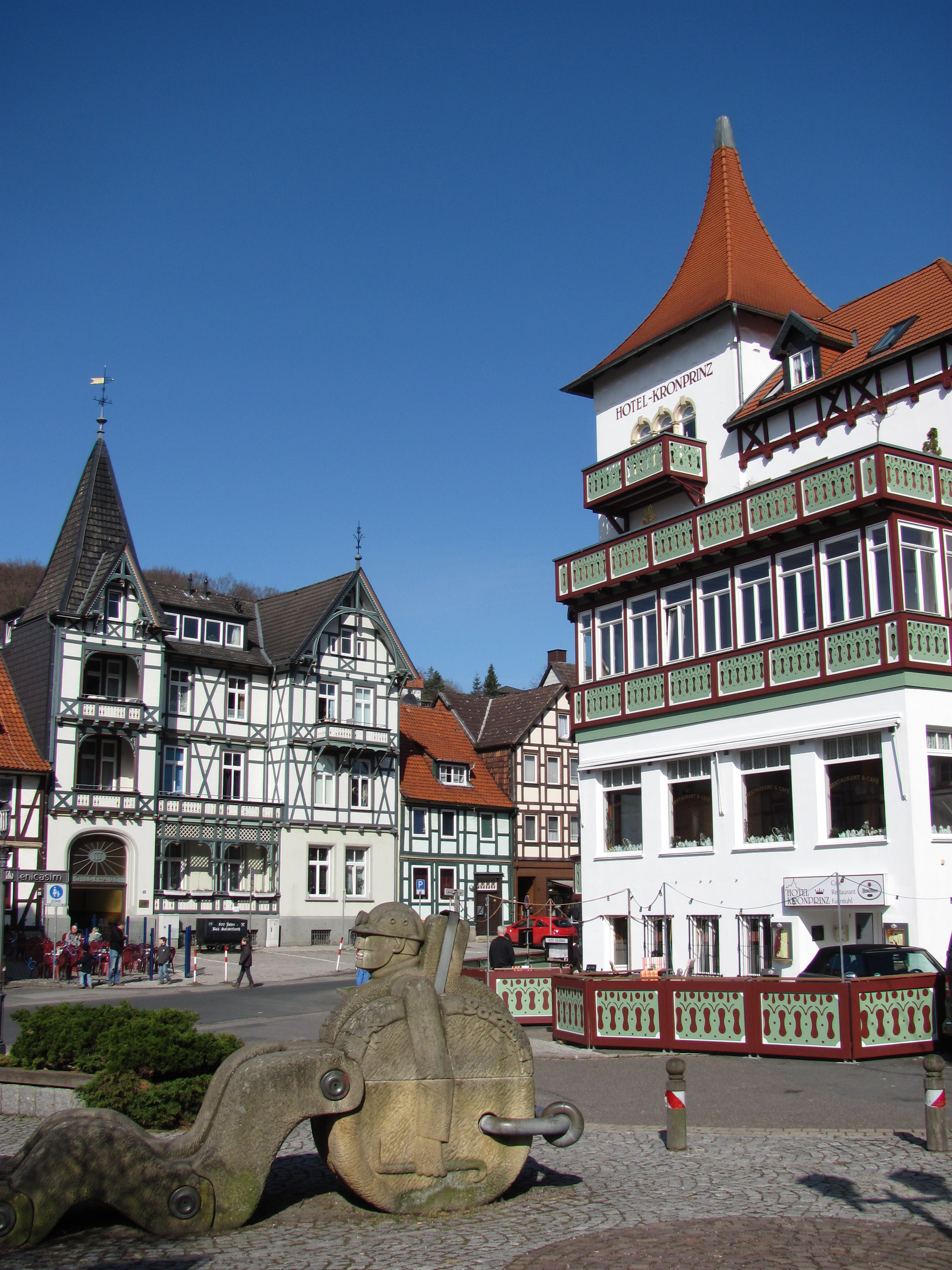
Miners' Guild Hall and memorial

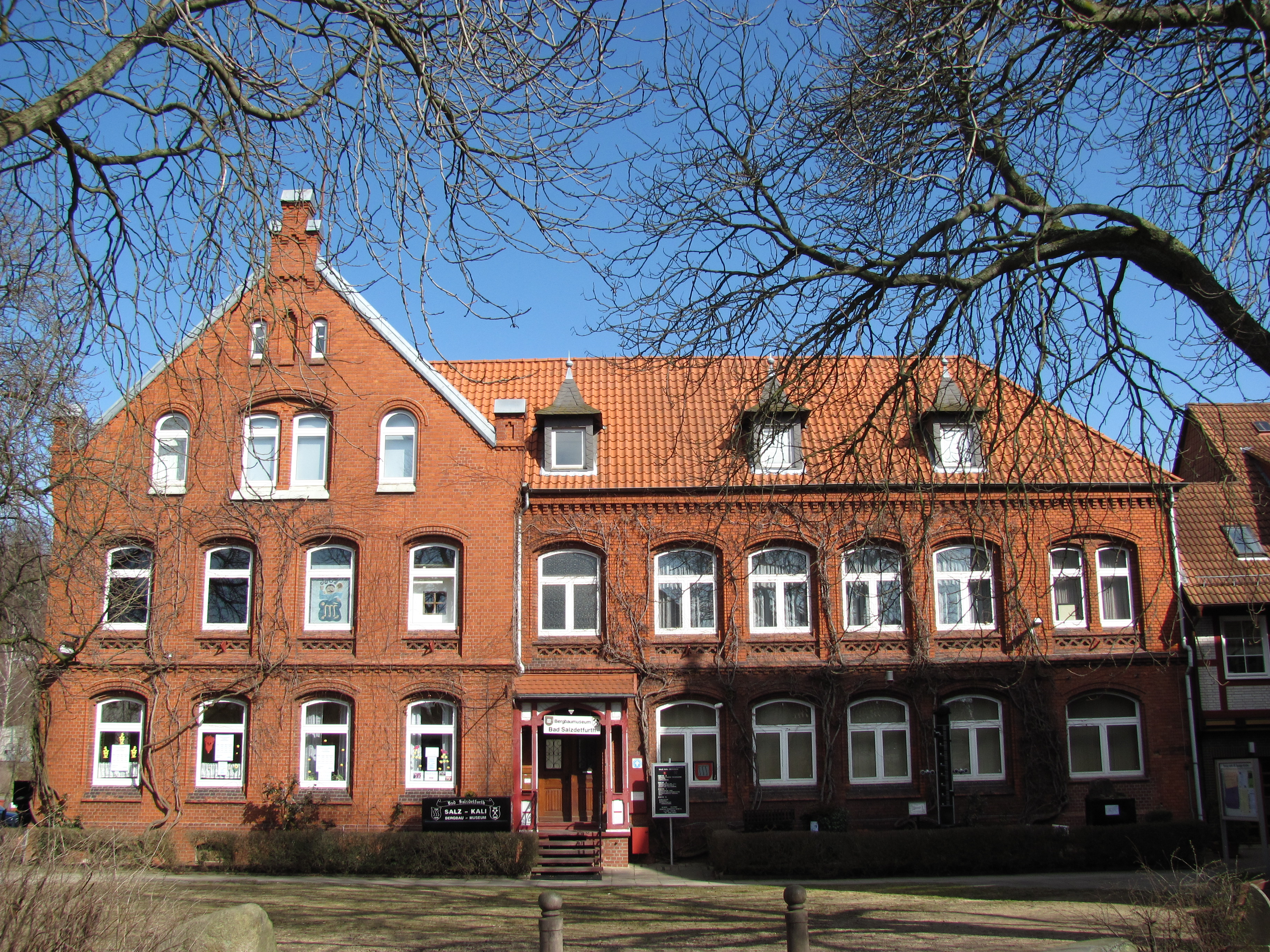
Museum dedicated to mining and history of the town

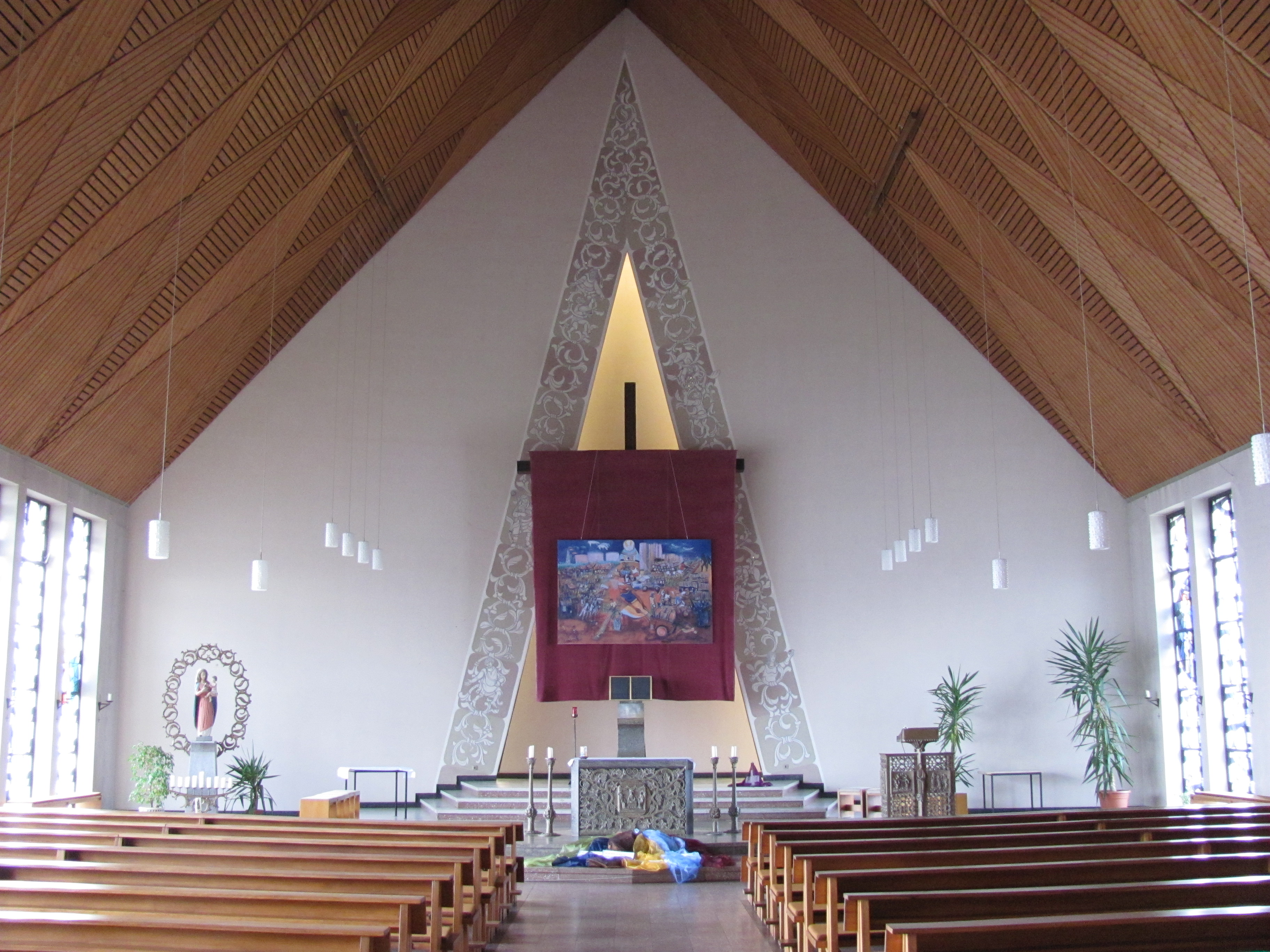
Catholic Church Holy Family (1960–61)

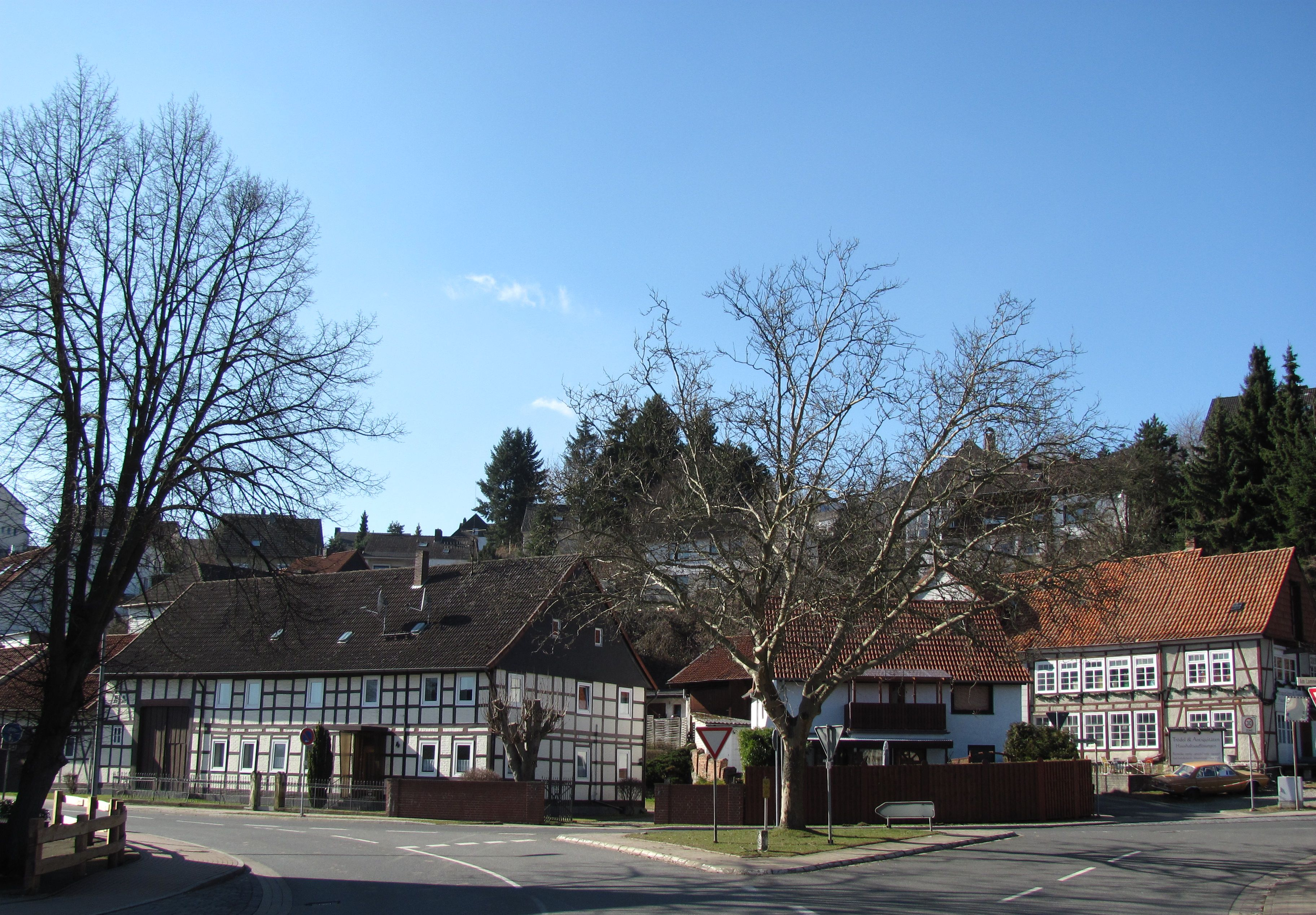
Wesseln, village centre

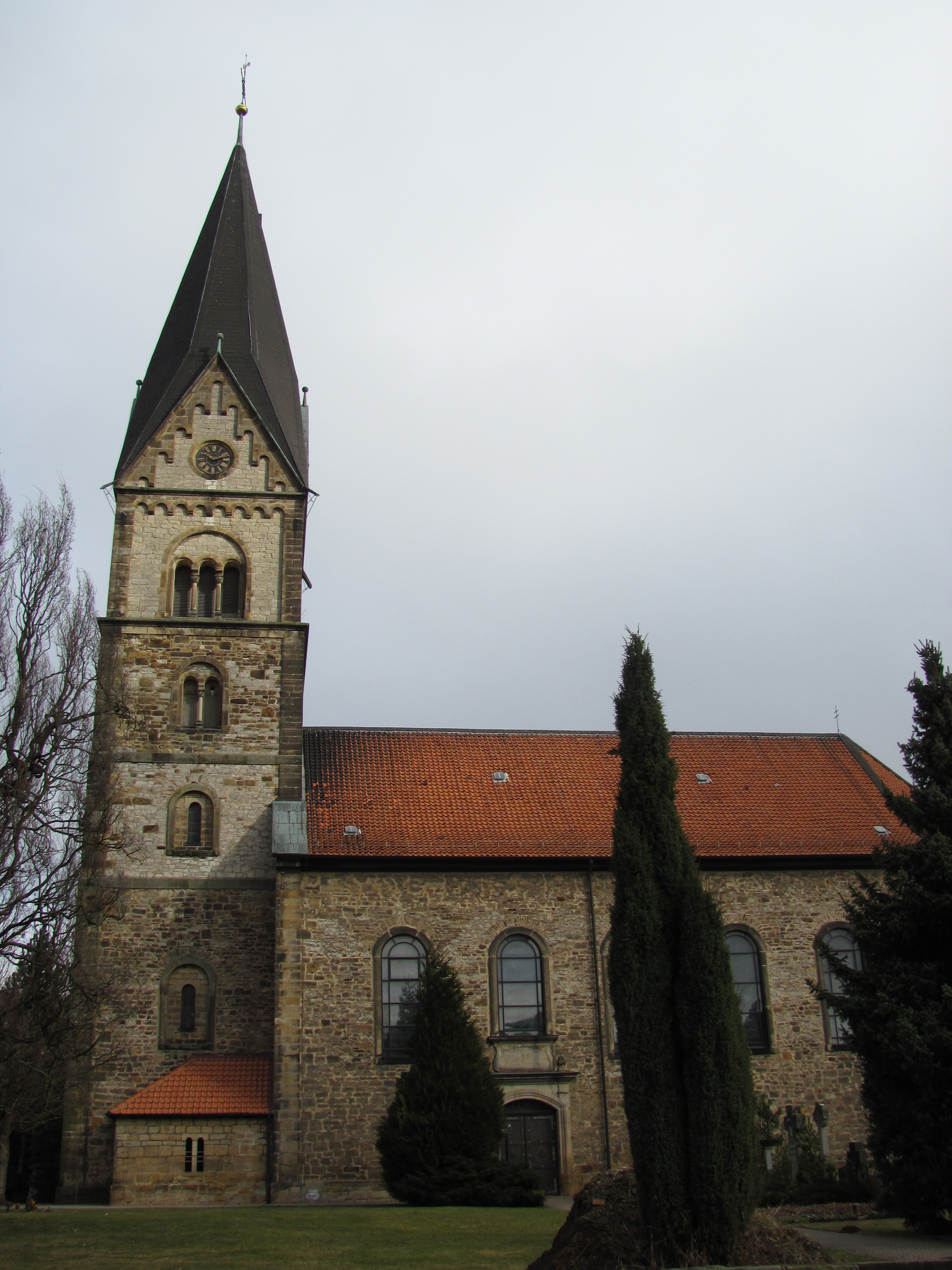
St. Gallus Church in Detfurth

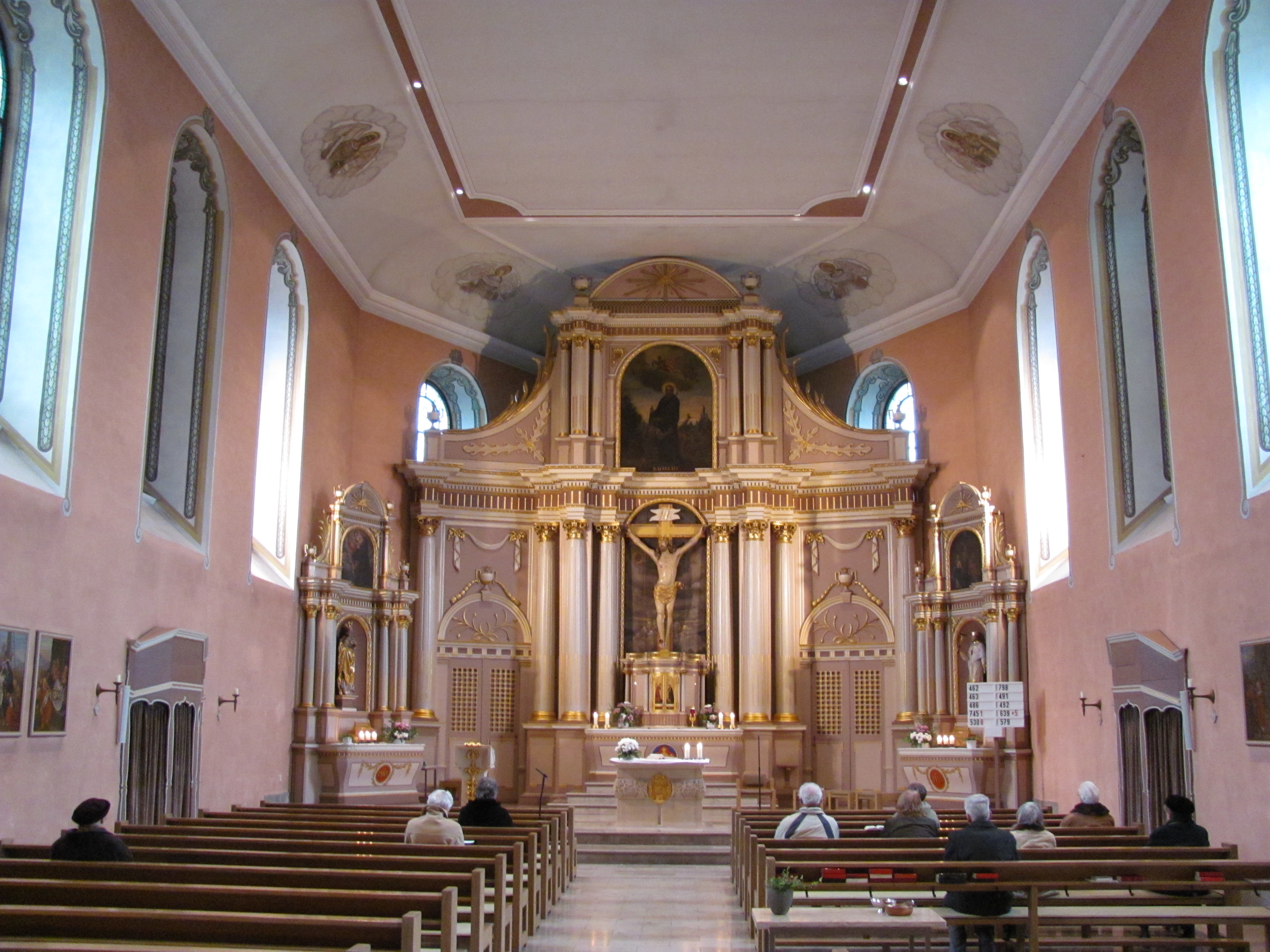
St. Gallus Church, Detfurth

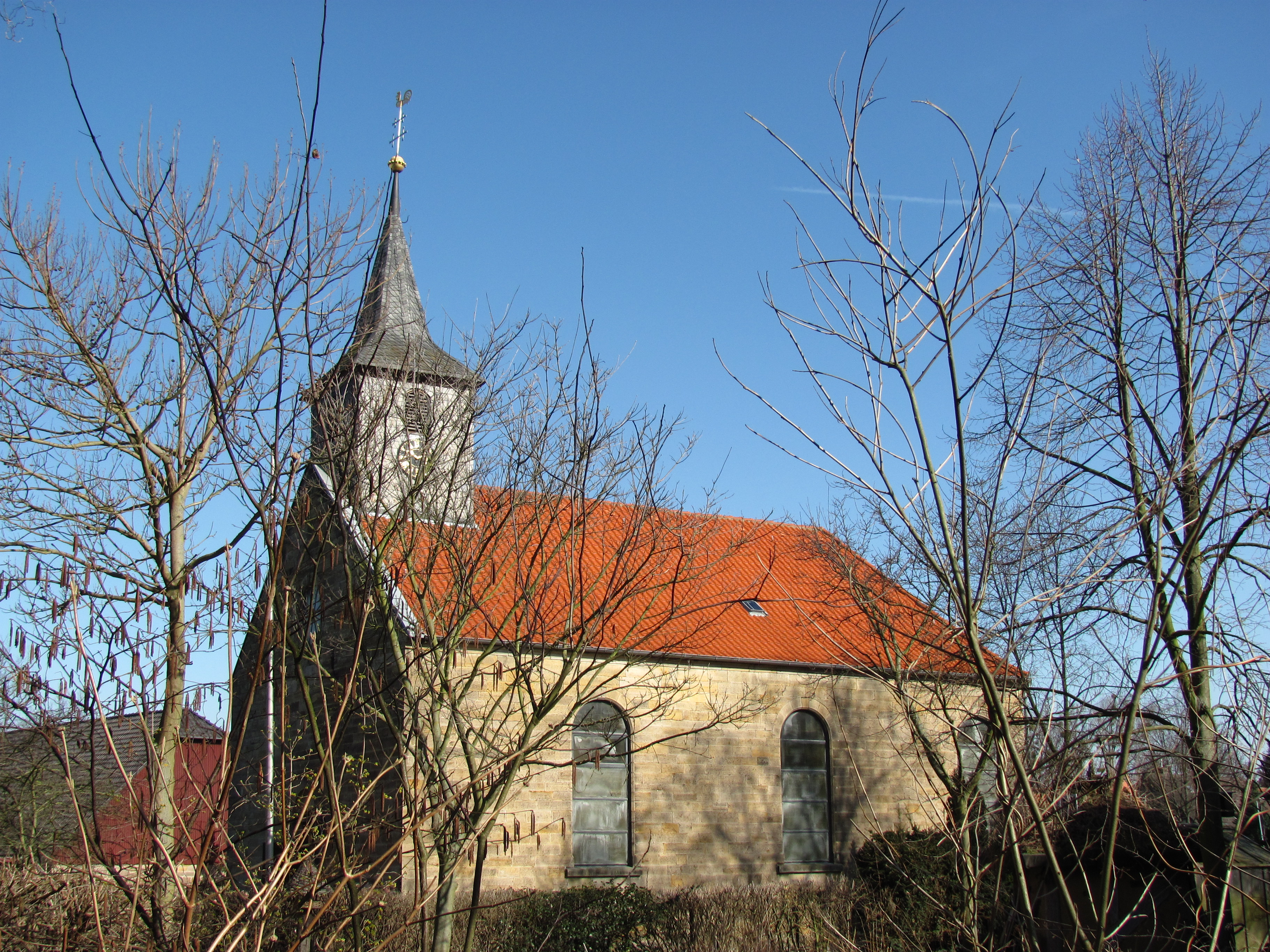
Church in Hockeln

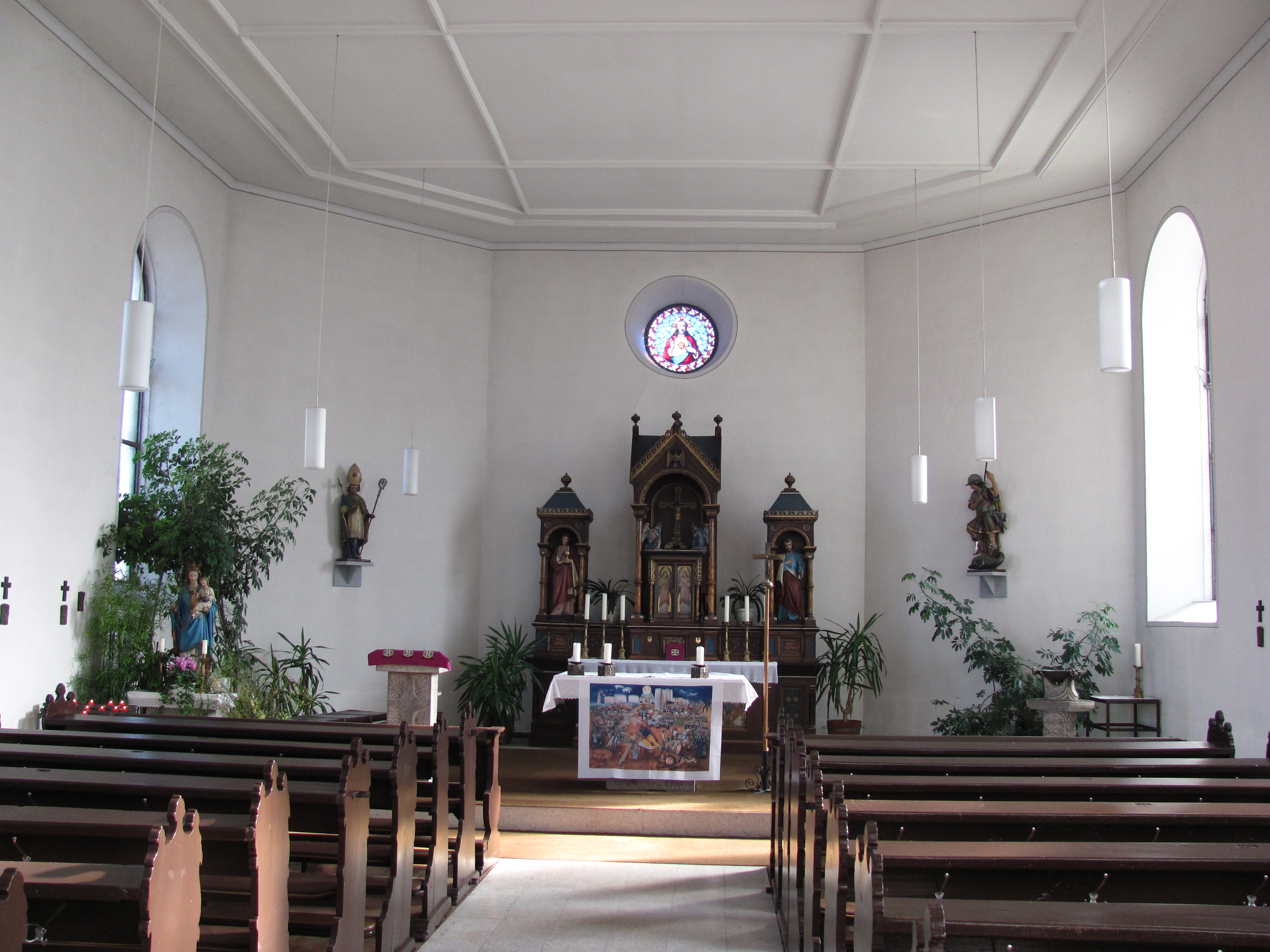
Church in Hockeln

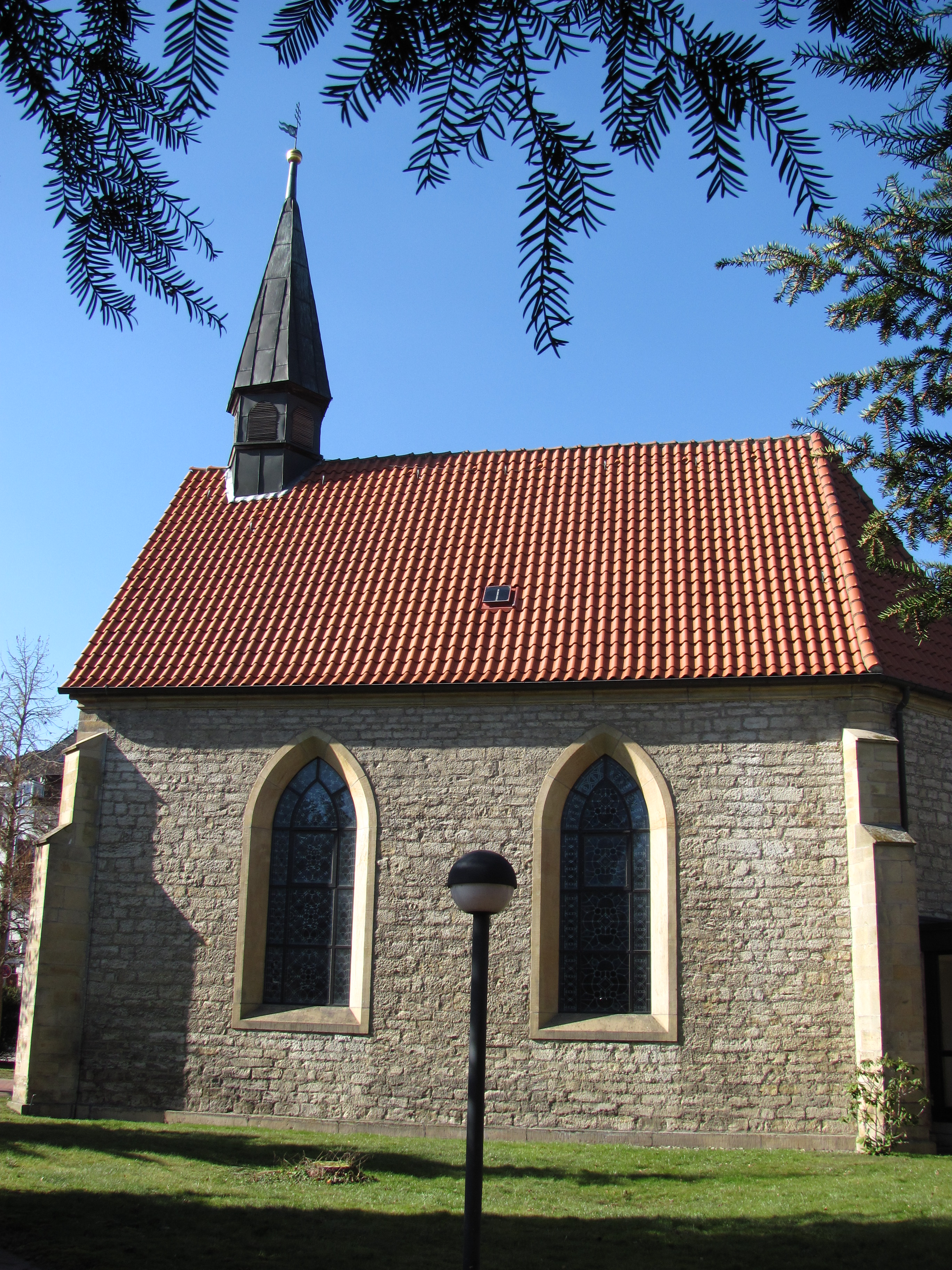
St. John's Church in Wesseln

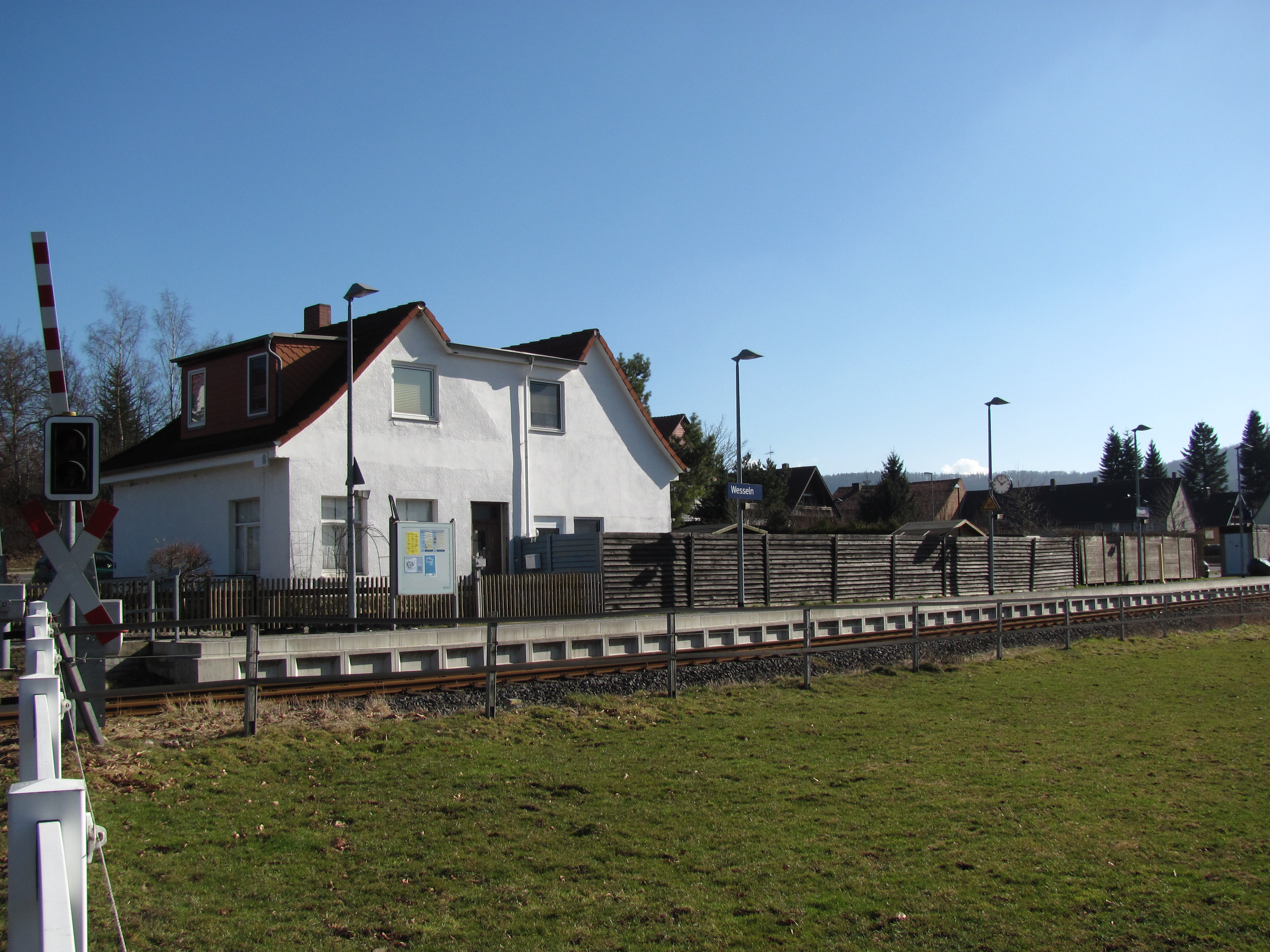
Railway halting place in Wesseln

== International relations ==
Bad Salzdetfurth is twinned with:

- Benicàssim, Spain
- Bochnia, Poland
- Yate, United Kingdom
- Kelbra, Germany

== Personality ==
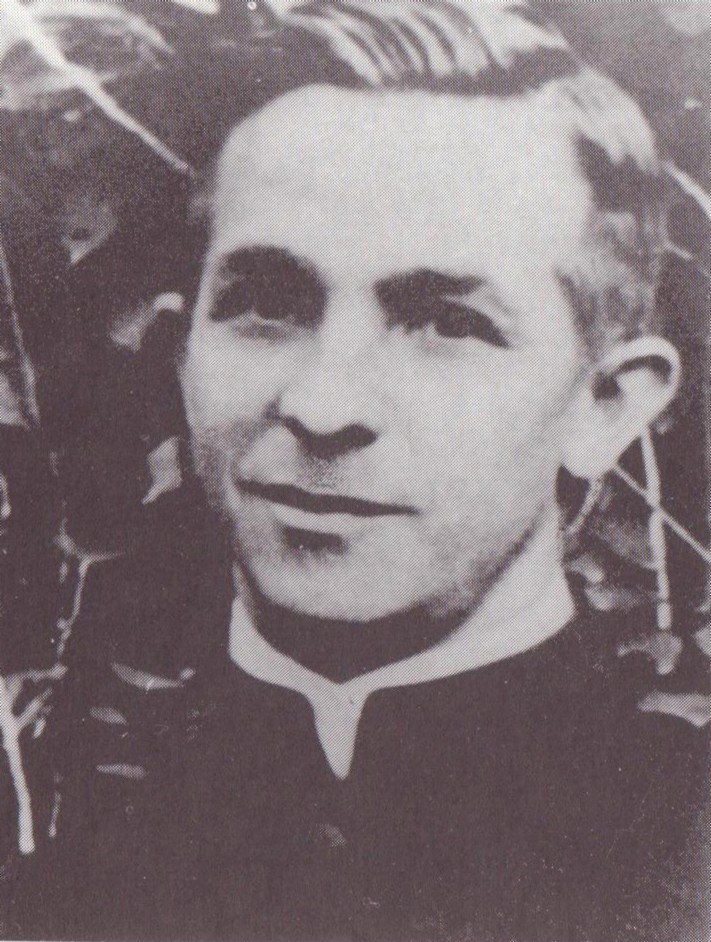
Joseph Müller (1920s)

=== Sons and daughters of the town ===
- Ulrike Rosenbach (born 1943), artist and art professor

=== Personalities who have worked locally ===
- Joseph Müller (priest) (1894-1944), priest, Nazi opponent
- Gottfried von Cramm (1909-1976), tennis player
- Daniel van Buyten (born 1978), football player
- Katharina Schiller (born 1984), swimmer

== In popular culture ==
It was mentioned in Tom Clancy's bestseller Red Storm Rising.
