= Oestrum =

Oestrum may refer to:

- Oestrum or Estrum, a phase in the estrous cycle
- Oestrum (Duisburg), a district of Duisburg, in North Rhine-Westphalia, Germany
- Östrum, a village in Lower Saxony, Germany

== See also ==
- Ostrum (disambiguation)
- Ostrom (disambiguation)
- Eestrum (or Jistrum), a village in the Netherlands
