= Joseph Müller (priest) =

German Catholic priest and martyr (1894–1944)

Servant of God Joseph Müller
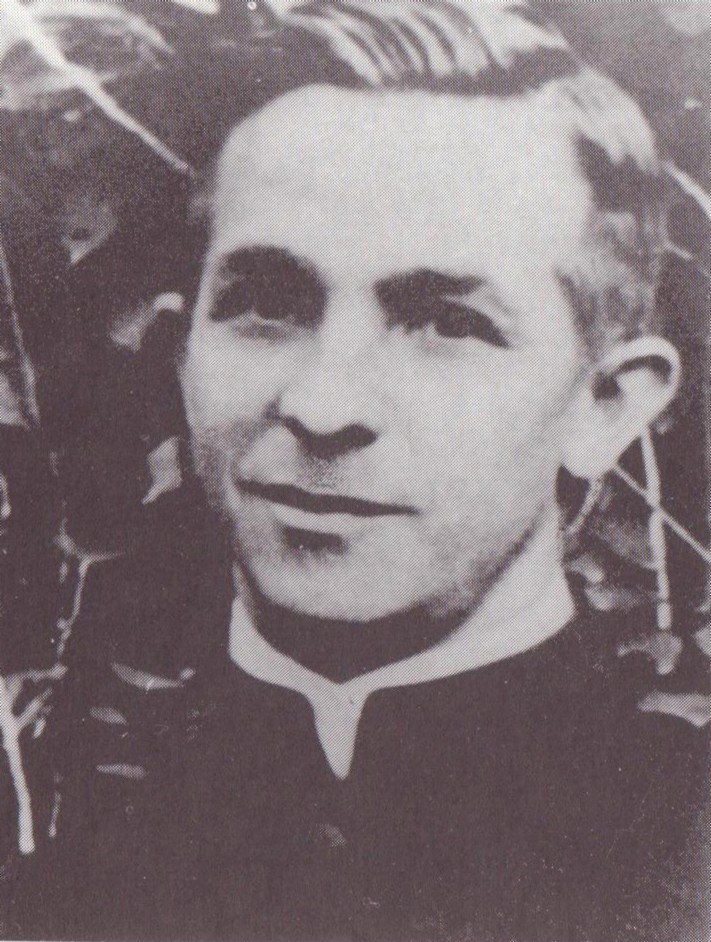
- Joseph Müller in the 1920s
- Born: August 19, 1894; Salmünster, Bad Soden-Salmünster, Germany
- Died: 11 September 1944 (aged 50); Brandenburg-Görden Prison, Brandenburg, Nazi Germany

Joseph Müller (19 August 1894 – 11 September 1944) was a German Catholic priest and critic of the Nazi regime. He was tried by the People's Court and executed at Brandenburg-Görden Prison.

== Life ==
=== Early life ===
Müller was born in Salmünster, Hesse, the youngest of seven children of the local cantor and teacher Damien Müller and his wife Augusta. After obtaining his Abitur degree, he served as a volunteer in World War I, where he was seriously injured.

=== Ecclesiastical career ===
After the war, Müller, two of whose brothers were ordained Catholic priests, resolved to become a preacher. He studied theology at the University of Münster and proceeded with his brother Oskar to the Diocese of Hildesheim. Both attended the Hildesheim seminary from 1921 and received holy orders from Bishop Joseph Ernst in the following year. Müller then became a chaplain in Duderstadt.

In 1924 Müller joined the Franciscan convent at Fulda, but later continued to work as a chaplain in Gehrden, Hannoversch Münden, Celle, and Wolfenbüttel. In 1931 he was installed as a priest in Bad Lauterberg. From 1934 he served as a priest in Süpplingen, from October 1937 in Heiningen. Due to his deteriorating health, he served in the small Catholic parish of Groß Düngen from 1 August 1943 onwards.

Though of frail physical condition, Müller was known as an inspiring orator, speaking frankly to his congregation. He was devoted to spiritual guidance, especially of young workers according to the teachings of Adolph Kolping. After the Nazi seizure of power in 1933, his youth work was increasingly repressed by the authorities and his activities were monitored by the Gestapo.

=== Arrest, trial and death ===
According to the 2007 documentary Laughing with Hitler, Müller was arrested after repeating a political joke:

A wounded soldier on his deathbed asked to see the people for whom he was laying down his life. The nurse laid a portrait of Hitler on one side, and a portrait of Göring on the other. Then, the soldier gasped, "Now I can die like Jesus Christ."

Müller was taken into custody and interrogated on 6 September 1943 under charges of Wehrkraftzersetzung (corroding defensive strength) for insinuating that Hitler and Göring were criminals. Under interrogation he did not reveal who had told him the joke. After being temporarily released, he was re-arrested on 15 May 1944 and deported to the Moabit remand prison in Berlin.

On 28 July 1944, Müller was appeared before the People's Court and was sentenced to death for Wehrkraftzersetzung by judge Roland Freisler. He was executed by guillotine in Brandenburg-Görden Prison on September 11 1944.

== Legacy ==
Since the end of World War II, each year on the anniversary of Müller's death, a bell is tolled at his former parish church in the village of Groß Düngen. His ashes were transferred to the local cemetery in November 1945.

In May 2016, the Roman Catholic Diocese of Hildesheim opened his cause of martyrdom, earning him the title Servant of God.
