= Östrum =

- Ortsteil of Bad Salzdetfurth
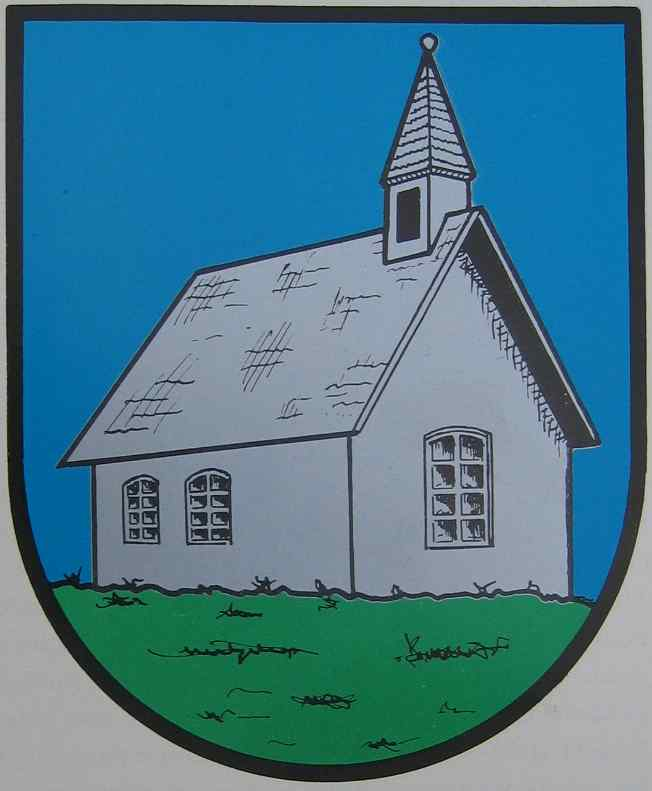
- Coat of arms
- Interactive map of Östrum
- Location within Germany Location within Lower Saxony
- Coordinates: 52°01′59″N 10°00′07″E
- Country: Germany
- State: Lower Saxony
- District: Hildesheim
- Town: Bad Salzdetfurth
- Elevation: 117 m (384 ft)

Population (2021)
  - Total: 368
- Time zone: UTC+01:00 (CET)
  - Summer (DST): UTC+02:00 (CEST)
- Postal codes: 31162
- Dialling codes: 05064

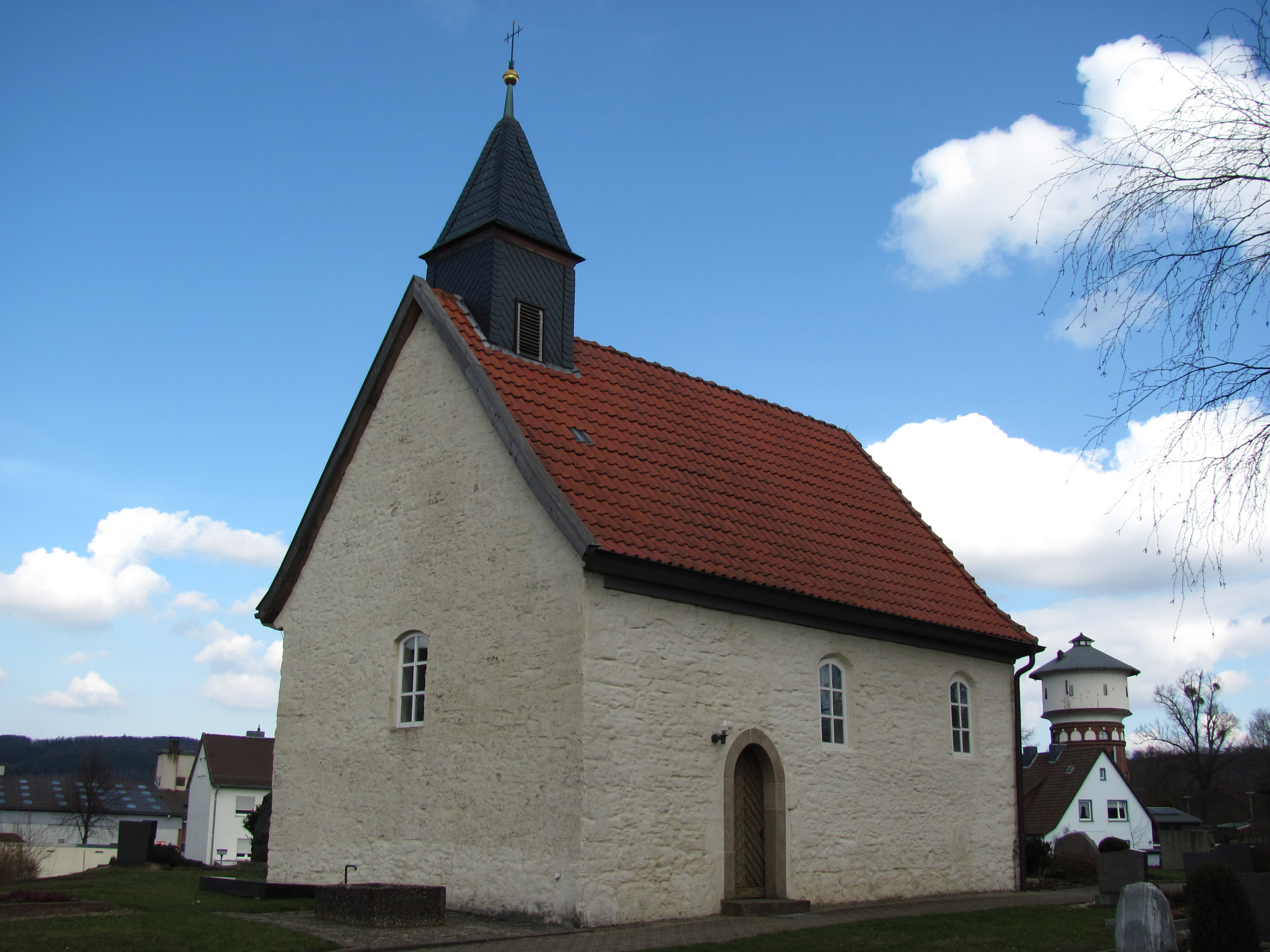
Chapel.

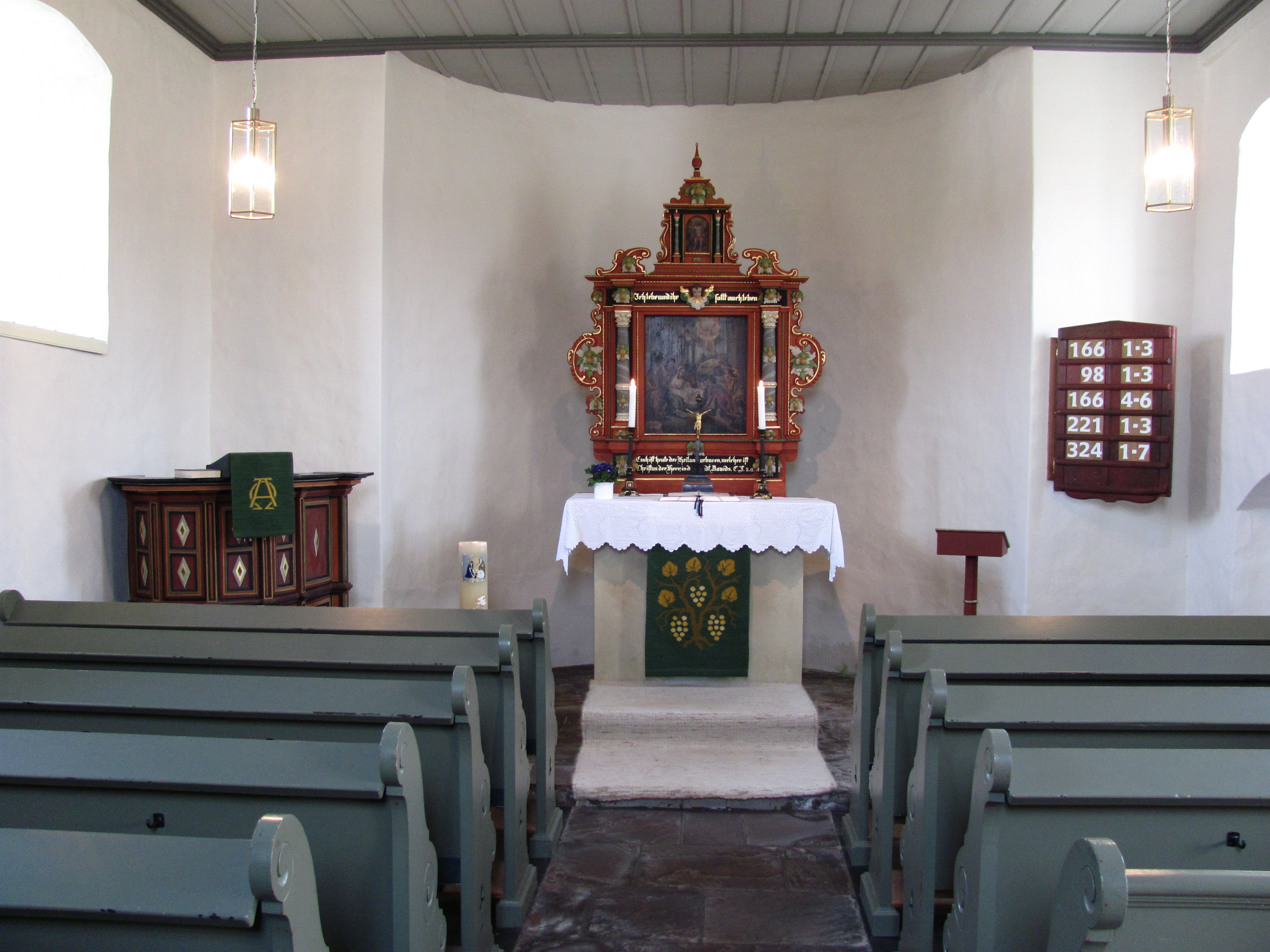
Interior.

Östrum is a village in the southern part of the town of Bad Salzdetfurth in Lower Saxony, Germany. The L 490 state road runs through the village crossing with the L493. Its immediate neighbours are the villages of Breinum to the west and Bodenburg to the south.

== History ==
As part of the administrative reform in 1974 Östrum became one of the 13 parishes in the borough of Bad Salzdetfurth.

== Politics ==
As of 2022, the parish chair is Thomas Andreas (SPD).

== Culture and places of interest ==
- The Protestant Chapel, which is the landmark of the village, was probably built around 800. Originally, it was dedicated to Saint Mary-Magdalena. The chapel is on a small hill which might be of an artificial origin. The year 1511 possible referring to a renovation is indicated above the entrance. The chapel has firing slits and might have been used as a fortified church during times of war in the Middle Ages. After the Reformation the chapel was allocated to the Protestants. When the chapel was renovated in 2005, frescoes dating from the 12th and 13th centuries were discovered. The altar in the apse dates from the end of the 17th century and its painting is from 1677. The chapel has a wooden ceiling and a gable roof with a flèche and its small apse has a tented roof. The medieval frescoes which were discovered in 2005 are not visible, as they were covered with white paint due to the lack of financial means for an appropriate restoration.

Twice a month the service is held in the chapel which has about 50 seats.
