= Bodenburg =

Coordinates: 52°02′N 10°01′E

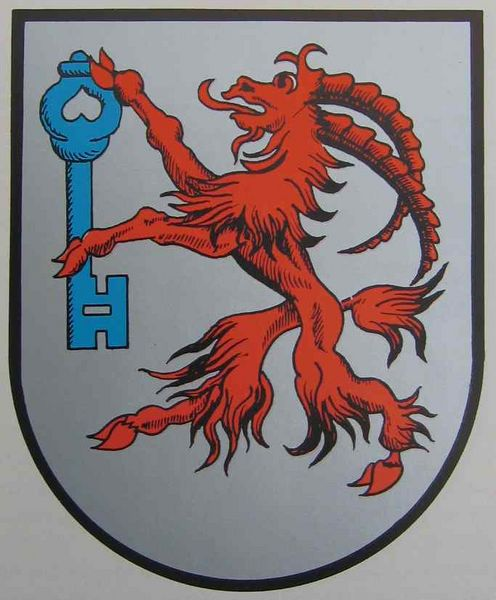
Coat of arms

Bodenburg is a village in Lower Saxony, Germany. It is located about 20 km south of Hildesheim, and about 5 km from Bad Salzdetfurth. The community has a population of 1,814 (2021).

== Overview ==
A castle with a moat and a stand-alone tower was built on the site c. 1000 AD, and the castle was soon accompanied by a village of half-timbered houses arranged in the shape of a T. The oldest document referring to Bodenburg was produced by the bishop of Hildesheim in 1142. The castle was the seat of a family of barons who supplemented their income with the salt of Salzdetfurth. In 1359 the Baron von Bodenburg became a vassal of the Duke of Braunschweig. It was mentioned in Tom Clancy's bestseller Red Storm Rising. In last century up to today the family von Cramm owned the Bodenburg castle. Thereof Gottfried von Cramm was a famous tennis player in the 1930s and 1940s playing at Wimbledon and French Open games. His tennis training ground still exists in the parc around the castle of Bodenburg.
