= Groß Düngen =

- Ortsteil of Bad Salzdetfurth
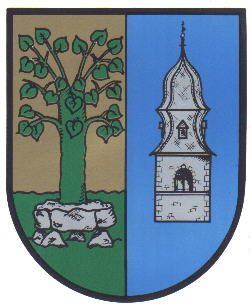
- Coat of arms
- Interactive map of Groß Düngen
- Location within Germany Location within Lower Saxony
- Coordinates: 52°05′42″N 10°01′22″E
- Country: Germany
- State: Lower Saxony
- District: Hildesheim
- Town: Bad Salzdetfurth
- Elevation: 87 m (285 ft)

Population (2021)
  - Total: 1,163
- Time zone: UTC+01:00 (CET)
  - Summer (DST): UTC+02:00 (CEST)
- Postal codes: 31162
- Dialling codes: 05064

Groß Düngen is a village in the town of Bad Salzdetfurth, in the north German state of Lower Saxony. It lies in the Innerste valley southeast of the county town of Hildesheim on the B 243 federal highway.

== History ==
The first recorded mention of the village dates to the year 1085. Until the demise of ecclesiastical principalities the village belonged to the Little Hildesheim Stift and is therefore among the so-called Catholic Stift villages. This is especially noticeably in the baroque parish church of St. Cosmas and Damian built in 1733; its tower also depicts the village coat of arms.

The independent parish of Groß Düngen was merged in 1966 with several neighbouring villages to become the municipality of Düngen (Samtgemeinde Düngen). This was incorporated in 1974 into the borough of Bad Salzdetfurth in 1974 (with the exception of Egenstedt and Marienburg).

== Politics ==
The village 'mayor' is Marc Busche (SPD).

== Culture and places of interest ==
- The Catholic church in the village is a baroque building that was built in 1733. In front of the altar there is a commemorative plaque in memory of Josepf Müller.
- Das Alte Fachwerkhaus is a half-timbered house dating from 1780 in the high street. The German name means "The Old Timber-Framed House". It was renovated in 1988 and transformed into a cultural centre. Today it is used for concerts and exhibitions. The Altes Fachwerkhaus houses a small local museum as well.

== Personalities ==
- Eduard Jakob Wedekin (1796-1870), Bishop of Hildesheim, born in Groß Düngen
- Joseph Müller (1894-1944), Catholic priest and martyr, priest of the Catholic parish of St. Cosmas und Damian in Groß Düngen from August 1943, executed by the Nazis in September 1944. His grave can be seen in front of the main entrance of the church.

== Gallery ==
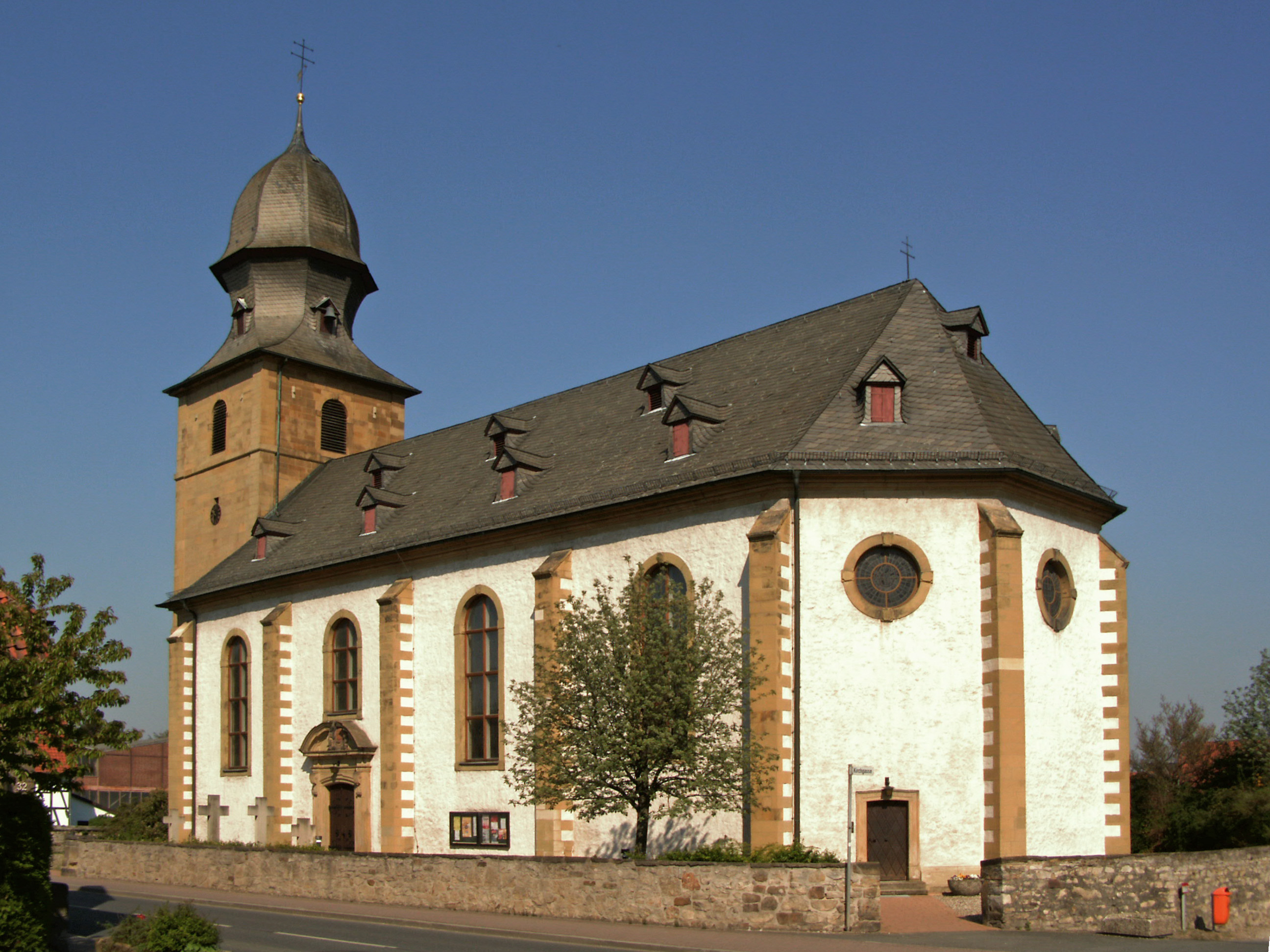
St. Cosmas and Damian

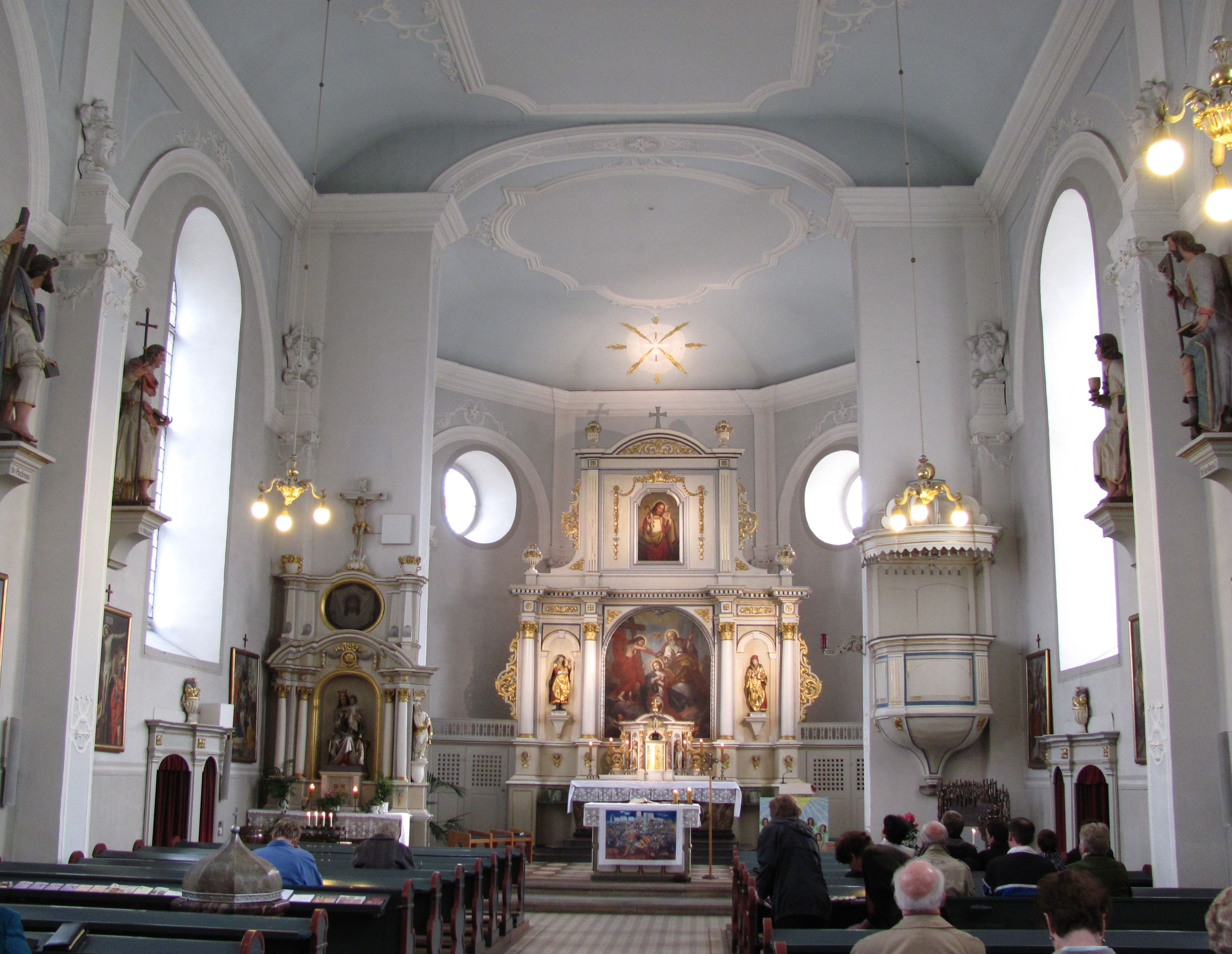
St. Cosmas and Damian

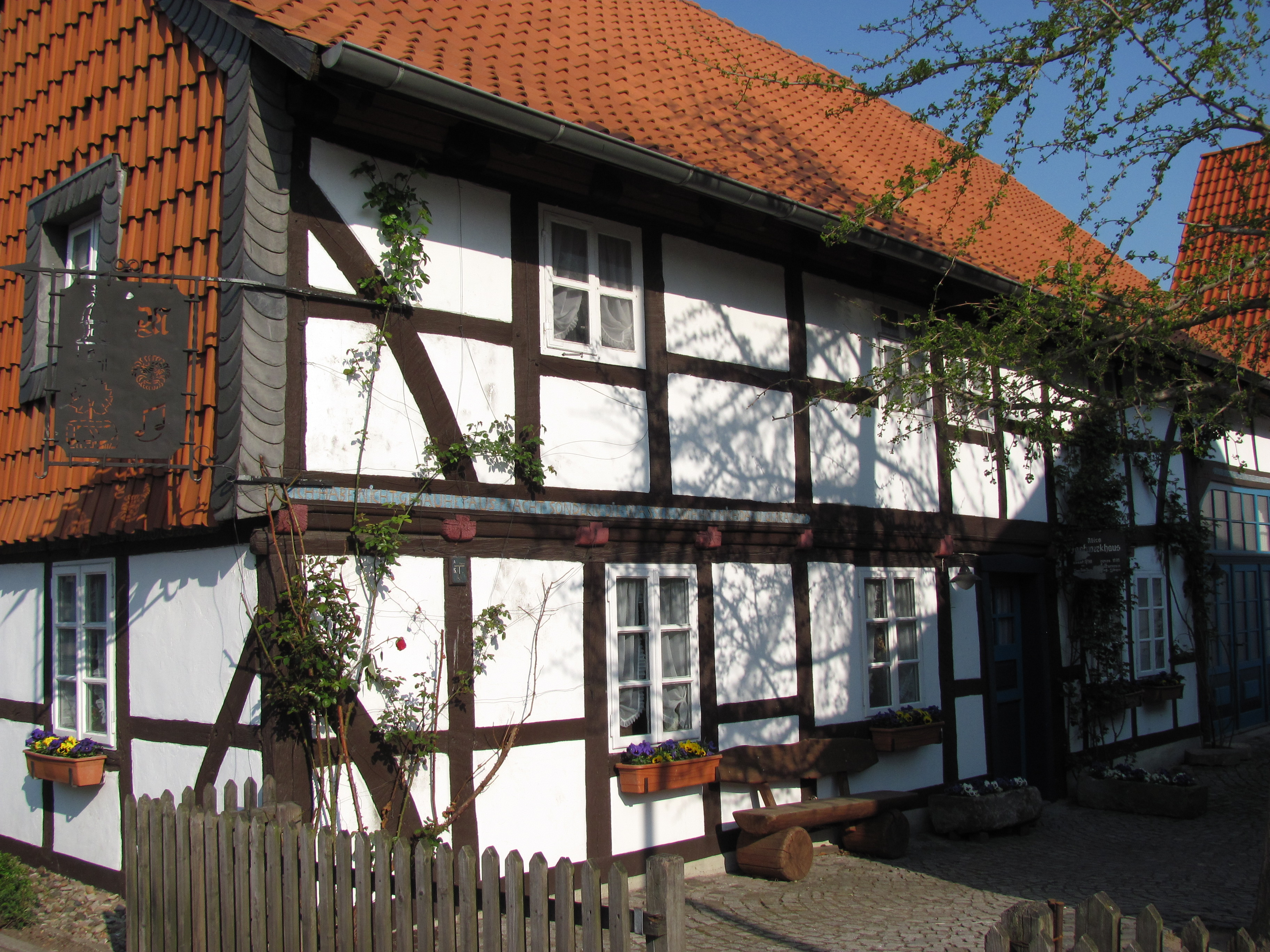
Cultural centre "Das Alte Fachwerkhaus"

== Sources ==
- Busche, Karl (1986). Groß-Düngen im Wandel der Zeit. Bad Salzdetfurth.
