= Sibbesse (Samtgemeinde) =

Coordinates: 52.050°N 9.900°E

Sibbesse is a former Samtgemeinde ("collective municipality") in the district of Hildesheim, in Lower Saxony, Germany. Its seat was in the village Sibbesse. On 1 November 2016 it was dissolved.

The Samtgemeinde Sibbesse consisted of the following municipalities:

1. Adenstedt
2. Almstedt
3. Eberholzen
4. Sibbesse
5. Westfeld
