= Vorberge =

Mountain range in Germany

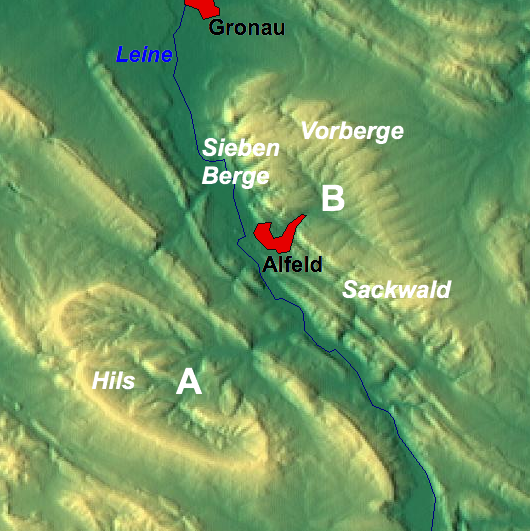
- The Vorberge near Alfeld as part of the Sackmulde (B)

Highest point
- Peak: Hainberg
- Elevation: 353 m above NN

Geography
- Country: Germany
- State: Lower Saxony
- District: Hildesheim
- Range coordinates: 52°01′00″N 9°53′00″E
- Parent range: Leine Uplands, Lower Saxon Hills

Geology
- Rock age: Cretaceous

The Vorberge ("fore-hills" or "foothills") are a ridge, up to 353 m above sea level (NN) high, in the Lower Saxon Hills and within the district of Hildesheim in the German state of Lower Saxony. Together with the Sieben Berge and the Sackwald, the Vorberge belong to the geological formation of the Sackmulde.

== Geography ==
The ridge of Vorberge is located in the eastern edge of the Leine Uplands in the Lower Saxon Hills. It lies between the town of Alfeld on the River Leine to the southwest and Sibbesse on the Alme to the north.

The Vorberge is surrounded by other uplands: the Hildesheim Forest to the north, the Sauberge to the east-northeast, Harplage to the east-southeast, the Heber to the southeast, the Sackwald to the south and the Sieben Berge to the west. Topographically, it transitions seamlessly to the last named range. Several streams rise within and on the edge of the Vorberge whose waters sooner or later find their way into the westward-flowing Leine or the northeastwards- running Innerste; it thus forms a watershed between the two rivers.

The unsettled hills of the Vorberge are crossed by several forest tracks and hiking trails which enable visitors to explored the wooded landscape. It is easily reached on the winding Landesstraße L 485 country road that branches off the B 3 in Alfeld, which runs northeast linking Alfeld with Sibbesse and with Hildesheim further to the north.

=== Hills ===
The hills of the Vorberge include the following (heights in metres above sea level (NN)):

- Hainberg (353.0 m) – west-southwest of Sibbesse
- Bremberg (352.6 m; also called the Brahmberg) – south-southwest of Sibbesse
- Sommerberg (335 m) – south of Sibbesse
- Wernershöhe (329 m) – southwest of Wrisbergholzen, part of Westfeld - with a communications tower
- Heiligenholzberg (ca. 305 m) – west of Adenstedt
- Hainholzberg (ca. 300 m) – southwest of Adenstedt on the boundary with the Sackwald
- Hettberg (327 m) – southwest of Sibbesse
- Roseberg (263 m) – northeast of Langenholzen, part of Alfeld

=== Streams ===
Amongst the streams in and around the Vorberge are the:

- Alme, rises in the north Vorberge, western tributary of the Riehe
- Despe, passes the Vorberge to the north running from east to west; eastern tributary of the Leine
- Hahmbach, rises in the north-northwestern part of the Vorberge on the boundary with the Sieben Berge, southern tributary of the Despe
- Riehe, passes the Vorberge to the east running from south to north; southwestern tributary of the Lamme

=== Settlements ===
The villages on the edge of the Vorberge include:

- Adenstedt in the catchment area of the Riehe, southeast of the Vorberge
- Almstedt on the Alme, east of the Vorberge
- Alfeld on the Leine, southwest of the Vorberge
- Sibbesse in the catchment area of the Despe, north of the Vorberge
- Westfeld in the catchment area of the Alme, northeast of the Vorberge

== Places of interest ==
Besides the woodlands themselves, places of interest in the Vorberge include the ruins of the Schulenburg Chapel (Schulenburger Kapelle), that stand northeast of Langenholzen and north of Sack (both in the borough of Alfeld) at about 353 m above NN.
