= Sackwald =

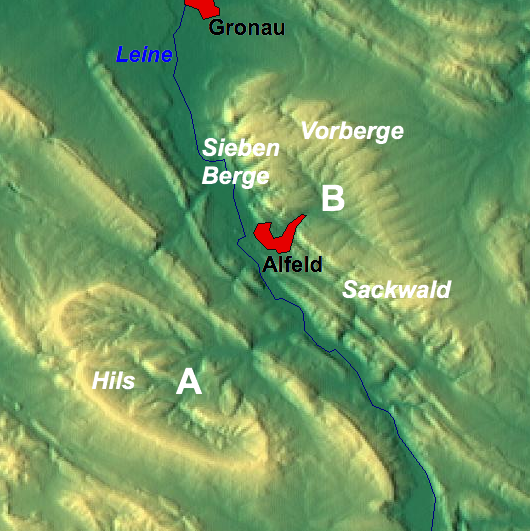
- The Sackwald near Alfeld as part of the Sackmulde (B)

Highest point
- Peak: Ahrensberg
- Elevation: 374 m above NN

Geography
- Country: Germany
- State: Lower Saxony
- District: Hildesheim district
- Range coordinates: 51°58′00″N 9°55′00″E
- Parent range: Leine Uplands

Geology
- Rock age: Cretaceous

The Sackwald (German pronunciation: [ˈzakˌvalt]) is a ridge, up to 374 m above sea level (NN) high, in the Lower Saxon Hills in the district of Hildesheim in the North German state of Lower Saxony. It is named after the village of Sack in the borough of Alfeld, the name meaning "Sack Forest".

The Sackwald is part of the geological structure of the Sack Basin or Sackmulde along with the Sieben Berge and the Vorberge.

== Geography ==
The Sackwald lies on the eastern edge of the Leine Uplands in the Lower Saxon Hills. It is located between the town of Alfeld on the River Leine to the northwest and the rather more distant town of Bad Gandersheim to the southeast.

The Sackwald is surrounded by the ridges of the Vorberge to the north, the southeastern foothills of the Hildesheim Forest to the north-northeast, the Sauberge to the northeast, the Harplage to the east-northeast, the Heber to the east, the Helleberg to the south and southwest, the Selter (on the other side of the Leine valley) to the southwest and the Sieben Berge to the northwest. Topographically it transitions into the last-named ridge seamlessly. Several streams rise within or on the edge of the Sackwald, whose waters eventually empty into the westward-running Leine or the northeast flowing Innerste; the ridge thus lies on the watershed between the two rivers.

The unpopulated Sackwald is crossed by several forest tracks and hiking trails, which enable the densely forested landscape to be explored. They include the Rennstieg path that runs through the forests and the Hohe Schanze Historic Educational Path (Historische Lehrpfad Hohe Schanze). The ridge may be reached over winding state roads (Landesstraßen) branching off the B 3 and B 64 federal roads, and link, for example, Alfeld, Freden and Lamspringe with one another.

=== Hills ===
Amongst the hills in the Sackwald are the following (heights in metres above sea level (NN)):

- Ahrensberg (374 m) – southwest of Woltershausen and northeast of Everode
- Paradiesgarten (336 m) – north of Everode
- Teufelskirche (330 m) – north of Everode
- Saurenberg (321 m) – north-northwest of Everode
- Hohe Schanze (326 m) – east of Winzenburg, site of the ruins of a Frankish mission station
- Gehlenberg (ca. 315 m) – west-southwest of Lamspringe
- Hainholzberg (ca. 300 m) – southwest of Adenstedt on the boundary with the Vorberge
- Kratzberg (ca. 300 m) – north of Alfeld-Hörsum
- Menteberg (300 m) – east of Alfeld
- Rüstiberg (288 m) – east of Everode
- Mullenberg (278 m) – north of Everode
- Winzenberg (272 m) – northeast of Winzenburg, site of Winzenburg Castle
- Buchenberg (270 m) – north-northwest of Everode
- Feldberg (267 m) – west-southwest of Lamspringe
- Horstberg (ca. 250 m) – east-southeast of Alfeld-Hörsum
- Tiebenberg (ca. 240 m) – north of Winzenburg, site of the Tiebenburg cultural monument

=== Waterbodies ===
Amongst the streams in or on the Sackwald are:

- Gande, rises in the southeastern part of the Sackwald, eastern tributary of the Leine
- Leine, passes the Sackwald a few kilometres away to the southwest, southern tributary of the Aller
- Riehe, rises in the southeastern part of the Sackwald, southwestern tributary of the Lamme
- Winzenburger Bach, rises in the southern part of the Sackwald, eastern tributary of the Leine

=== Villages ===
Amongst the villages on the edge of the Sackwald are:

- Adenstedt in the catchment area of the Riehe, north-northeast of the Sackwald
- Alfeld on the Leine, northwest of the Sackwald
- Bad Gandersheim on the Gande, a few kilometres southeast of the Sackwald
- Everode in the catchment area of the Leine, west of the Sackwald
- Freden on the Leine, south-southwest of the Sackwald
- Lamspringe on the Lamme, east of the Sackwald
- Sack (Alfeld) the village the forest was named after, northwest of the Sackwald
- Winzenburg on the Winzenburger Bach, south of the Sackwald
- Woltershausen in the catchment area of the Riehe, east of the Sackwald

== Points of interest ==
Apart from the forested landscape itself, the points of interest in the Sackwald include the ruins of a Frankish mission station on the Hohe Schanze, the ruins of Winzenburg Castle on the Winzenberg and the cultural monument of Tiebenburg on the Tiebenberg. Also worth seeing are the ruins of the Schulenburg Chapel, which stand northeast of Langenholzen and north of Sack (both in the borough of Alfeld) at about 185 metres above sea level on the southwestern edge of the neighbouring Vorberge.

== Sources ==
- Ernst Andreas Friedrich: Naturdenkmale Niedersachsens. Hanover, 1980, ISBN 3-7842-0227-6.
