= Ahrensberg =

Ahrensberg may refer to:

- Ahrensberg (Habichtswald), a hill in Hesse, Germany
- Ahrensberg (Sackwald), a hill in Lower Saxony, Germany
