= Helleberg (ridge) =

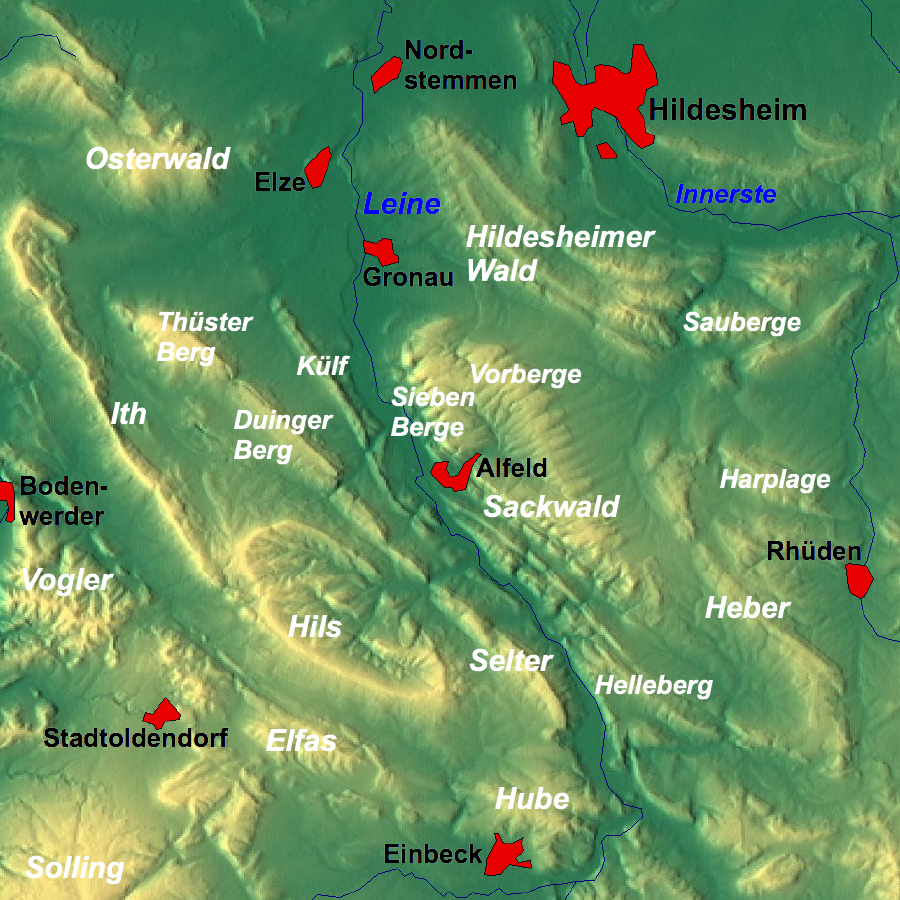
- Overview map: the Helleberg ridge is bottom right

Highest point
- Peak: Schildhorst
- Elevation: 297.5 m (976 ft)

Dimensions
- Length: 8 km (5.0 mi)

Geography
- State: Lower Saxony
- Range coordinates: 51°54′29″N 9°57′1″E
- Parent range: Leinebergland

Geology
- Rock age(s): Bunter sandstone, Muschelkalk
- Rock type(s): Sandstone, Siltstone, Claystone, Limestone, Marl

The Helleberg is a hill ridge up to 297.5 m above NN in the Lower Saxon Hills and within the counties of Hildesheim and Northeim in Lower Saxony, Germany.

== Geography ==
=== Location ===
The Helleberg lies in the east of the Leine Uplands, a northern part of the Lower Saxon Hills. It extends for about 8.5 km within a triangle formed by the villages of Freden, Bad Gandersheim and Kreiensen. It lies between Schildhorst to the northwest, Wetteborn and Dankelsheim to the east, Clus and Bad Gandersheim to the southeast, Orxhausen to the south, Heckenbeck and Hilprechtshausen to the southwest and Siedlung Leinetal and Domäne Haus Freden to the west.

North of the Helleberg is the Sackwald, to the northeast is the Heber and to the southwest on the far side of the Leine is the Hube and to the west also on the other side of the river is the Selter. To the south the Gande flows roughly east to west into the Leine, which passes the ridge to the west flowing from south to north.

To the south the B 3 runs past the Helleberg. In the Hoheroth, an elevation of the Selter, is the 1,641 metre-long Helleberg Tunnel which is part of the Hanover–Würzburg high speed railway. To the west the Hanoverian Southern Railway (Hanover to Göttingen) runs in a north-south direction past the ridge in the valley of the Leine, with stations in Kreiensen and Freden. In this valley is the lower basin of the Erzhausen Pumped-Storage Station.

=== Hills ===
Among the hills of the Helleberg are the following, sorted by height in metres above Normalnull (NN)

- Schildhorst (297.5 m)
- Steinbrink (273 m)
- Hoheroth (250.1 m) – with the 1,641 m long Helleberg Tunnel
- Clusberg (249.6 m) – with viewing tower and transmitter
- Sauberg (c. 242.4 m)

== Hiking ==
Numerous forest tracks and paths run over the Helleberg, including one along its crest from Schildhorst and Bad Gandersheim. Over the ridge runs part of the E11 European long distance route, by which there are tumuli with an information board.
