= Sieben Berge =

- Location within Lower Saxony

Highest point
- Peak: Hohe Tafel
- Elevation: 395 m above NN

Geography
- Country: Germany
- State: Lower Saxony
- District: Hildesheim district
- Range coordinates: 52°01′30″N 9°49′30″E
- Parent range: Leine Uplands

Geology
- Rock age: Cretaceous

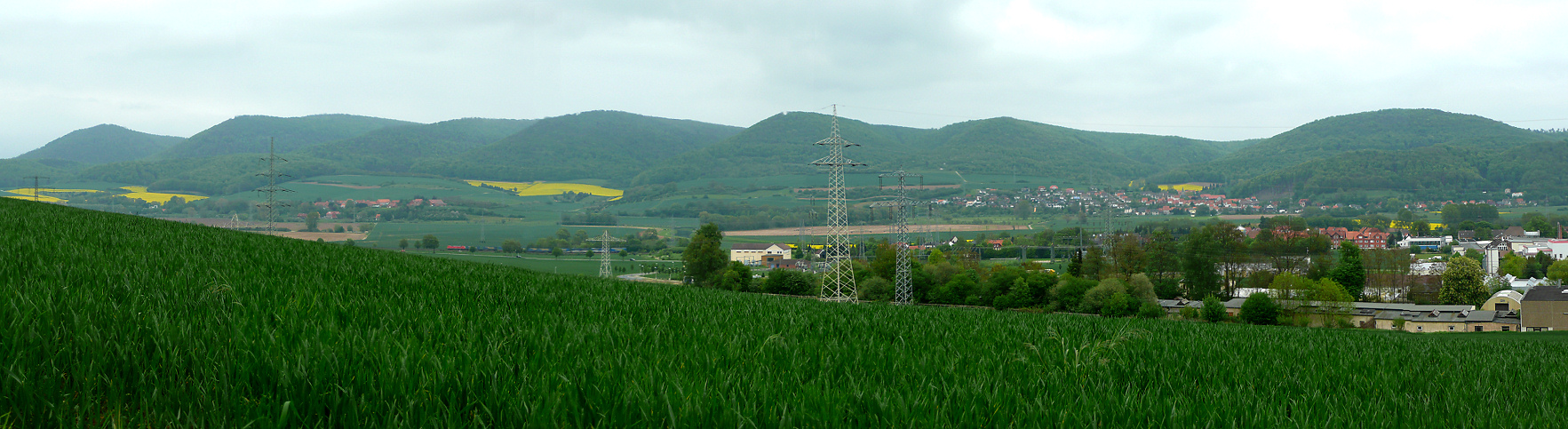
The Sieben Berge seen from the west

The Sieben Berge ("Seven Hills") are a ridge of hills up to 395 m above sea level (NN) in the Lower Saxon Hills in the district of Hildesheim, Lower Saxony, Germany. Together with the Vorberge and the Sackwald the Sieben Berge belong to the geological formation of the Sackmulde.

They are famous as a result of the fairy tale, Snow White.

== Geography ==
The Sieben Berge ridge is located in the east of the Leine Uplands, a northern part of the Lower Saxon Hills. It lies between Gronau on the Leine to the north, Sibbesse to the northeast and Alfeld to the south.

The Sieben Berge are surrounded by the hills of the Hildesheim Forest to the northeast, the Sauberge to the east-northeast, the Vorberge to the east and the Sackwald to the southeast. To the west runs the valley of the Leine, behind which rises the Ith ridge. Topographically it transitions to the Vorberge almost seamlessly. Within and on the edge of the Sieben Berge rise several brooks whose waters flow, sooner or later, into the Leine.

There are no roads through the unpopulated Sieben Berge, but it is crossed by several forest tracks and walking trails (including the roughly 15 km long Snow White Path, which was named in 2002), on which the wooded terrain can be explored. It may be reached via, for example, the winding state road (Landesstraße) of the L 485 which branches off the B 3 in Alfeld, and which runs northeast linking Alfeld with Sibbesse and, further to the north, Hildesheim.

== Snow White ==
The Sieben Berge gained fame from the tale of Snow White, written in the 19th century by the Brothers Grimm. In the fairy tale, Snow White lives with the seven dwarfs behind the Sieben Berge.

== Hills ==
The Sieben Berge, whose highest hill is the Hohe Tafel (395 m above NN), comprise the following elevations as seen from north to south (heights in metres above Normalnull):

- Hörzen (364.1 m) – east of Brüggen
- Hohe Tafel (395 m; also Tafelberg) – east-southeast of Brüggen – with Ernst Binnewies Tower (colloquially: Tafelberg Tower; observation tower)
- Saalberg (313.2 m) – southeast of Brüggen
- Ostenberg (359.8 m) – east of Dehnsen (municipality of Alfeld)
- Lauensberg (333.4 m) – north-northeast of Eimsen (municipality of Alfeld)
- Heimberg (316.3 m) – northeast of Eimsen
- Himmelberg (307.5 m) – north of Alfeld – with the Himmelberg Tower (22,12 m high)

Other elevations that border on the Sieben Berge are (in order of height):

- Nesselberg (362.2 m) – east-southeast of Brüggen
- Nußberg (301 m) – between Rheden and Eberholzen - with its nearby transmission tower
- Ortsberg (279 m) – northeast of Alfeld

The Nußberg, which is found north of the hill range, is sometimes counted - according to various sources - instead of the Himmelberg, which is in the extreme southeast of the ridge, as either the first or seventh hill in the Sieben Berge.

== Waterways ==
The waterways in and around the Sieben Berge include the:

- Despe, passes the Sieben Berge to the north flowing in an east-west direction, eastern tributary of the Leine
- Hahmbach, rises in the north-northeastern part of the Sieben Berge where it joins the Vorberge, southern tributary of the Despe
- Leine, passes the Sieben Berge to the west in a south to north direction, left tributary of the Aller, tributary of the Weser
- Wispe, flows by Wispenstein into the Leine

== Settlements ==
Settlements on the edge of the Sieben Berge include the:

- Alfeld on the Leine, south of the Sieben Berge
- Brüggen on the Leine, northwest of the Siebe Berge
- Eberholzen am Hahmbach, north-northeast of the Sieben Berge
- Gronau on the Leine, north of the Sieben Berge
- Rheden east of the Leine, west of the Sieben Berge
- Sibbesse in the catchment area of the Despe, northeast of the Sieben Berge
