= Ahrensberg (Sackwald) =

Hill in Germany

Coordinates: 51°57′44″N 9°56′4″E

The Ahrensberg, at 374 metres, is the highest hill in the Sackwald range in the district of Hildesheim, in the north German state of Lower Saxony.

== Geography ==
The densely forested Ahrensberg rises in the Leine Uplands, part of the Lower Saxon Hills. It is located in the Sackwald, that lies between the towns of Alfeld on the Leine to the northwest and the somewhat distant Bad Gandersheim to the southeast. Within this forest region it rises southwest of Woltershausen and northeast of Everode.

== Watersheds ==
The Ahrensberg lies on the watershed between the Leine to the west and Innerste to the north. The waters of all streams that flow west from this hill empty into the Leine via the little Meierbach stream. The waters that flow east and northeast enter the Innerste via the Riehe and Lamme.

== Villages ==
The villages near the Ahrensberg include:

- Everode within the catchment area of the Meierbach and Leine, southwest of the Ahrensberg
- Woltershausen in the catchment area of the Riehe, Lamme and Innerste, northeast of the Ahrensberg
