= Gande (river) =

River in Germany

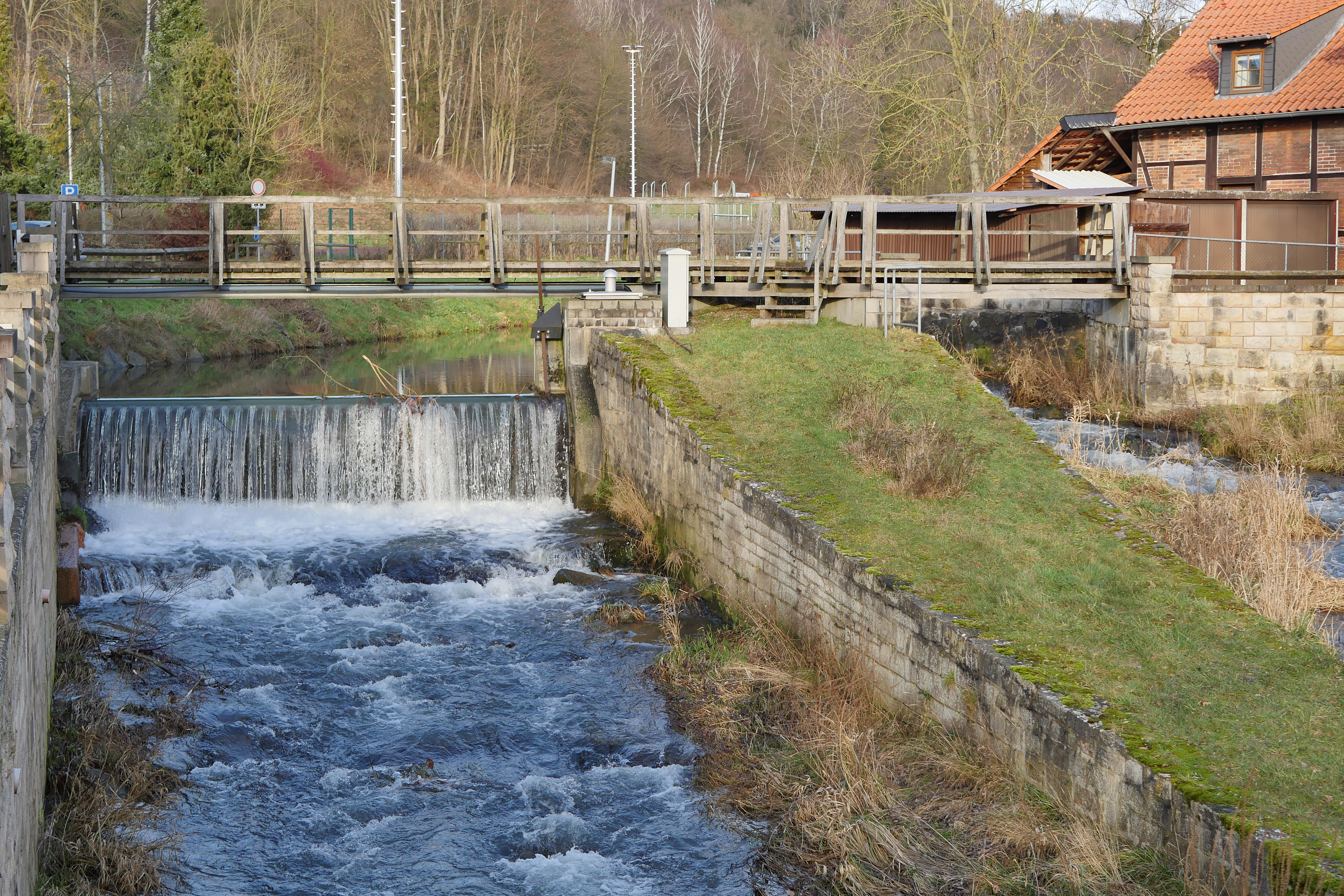
- The Gande in Bad Gandersheim

Location
- Country: Germany
- State: Lower Saxony

Physical characteristics
- Source
  - location: near Lamspringe
- Mouth
  - location: near Kreiensen
  - coordinates: 51°51′15″N 9°56′57″E
- Length: 19.2 km (11.9 mi)
- Discharge
  - location: at Gandersheim gauge
  - average: 0.824 m^{3}/s (29.1 cu ft/s)
  - minimum: Record low: 0.010 m^{3}/s (0.35 cu ft/s)/s (in 24.10.1977); Average low: 0.166 m^{3}/s (5.9 cu ft/s)
  - maximum: Average high: 15.9 m^{3}/s (560 cu ft/s); Record high: 41.8 m^{3}/s (1,480 cu ft/s) (in 28.10.1998)

Basin features
- Progression: Leine→ Aller→ Weser→ North Sea
- Landmarks: Small towns: Bad Gandersheim
- Tributaries
  - left: Meine, Eterna

The Gande is a river of Lower Saxony, Germany. It is a right-hand tributary of the River Leine.

== Course ==
The Gande rises near the town of Lamspringe on the eastern side of the Sackwald in the county of Hildesheim and flows from there southwards between the Sackwald and the Heber ridges. It enters the district of Northeim near Altgandersheim (a subdivision of Bad Gandersheim). At Bad Gandersheim it turns west and empties into the Leine at Kreiensen.

== See also ==
- List of rivers of Lower Saxony
