= Harsum =

- Municipality
- Coat of arms

- Location of Harsum within Hildesheim district
- Interactive map of Harsum
- Location within Germany Location within Lower Saxony
- Coordinates: 52°12′N 9°57′E
- Country: Germany
- State: Lower Saxony
- District: Hildesheim

Government
  - Mayor (2021–26): Marcel Litfin (Ind.)

Area
  - Total: 49.93 km^{2} (19.28 sq mi)
- Elevation: 70 m (230 ft)

Population (2025-12-31)
  - Total: 10,756
  - Density: 215.4/km^{2} (557.9/sq mi)
- Time zone: UTC+01:00 (CET)
  - Summer (DST): UTC+02:00 (CEST)
- Postal codes: 31177
- Dialling codes: 05127
- Vehicle registration: HI
- Website: www.harsum.de

Harsum is a village and a municipality in the district of Hildesheim, in Lower Saxony, Germany. It is situated approximately 6 km north of Hildesheim, and 25 km southeast of Hanover.

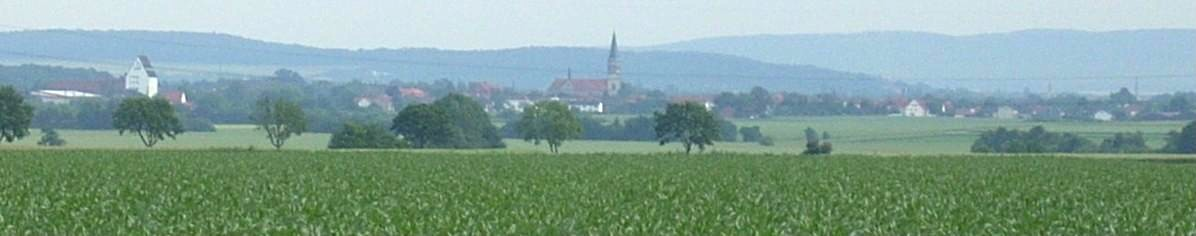
Harsum view from north with St. Cäcilia

== Subdivisions ==
Besides Harsum proper, the municipality consists of the villages of Adlum, Asel, Borsum, Hönnersum, Hüddessum, Klein Förste, Machtsum and Rautenberg.

== Personalities ==
- Johannes Nordhoff (1870-1950), Chairman of the Employers' Association of German Insurance Companies
- Joop Bergsma (1928-2011), Roman Catholic clergyman and theologian
