= SG Adenstedt =

German football club

- Full name: Sportgemeinschaft von 1894 e.V. Adenstedt
- Founded: 1894/1914
- Ground: Am Odishain
- Capacity: 3,000
- League: 2. Kreisklasse Peine-Süd (X)
- 2014–15: 4th
Home colours	Away colours

SG Adenstedt is a German football club from the city of Adenstedt, Lower Saxony. The club has its roots in the establishment of the gymnastics club Turnverein Adenstedt in 1894. A football department was formed within the association in 1914; today the sports club also has departments for handball and tennis.

== History ==
The footballers went their own way as the independent club Eiche Adenstedt in 1918, which was renamed Spielvereinigung Adenstedt in 1926. SV was reunited with parent club TV in 1935 to become Turn- und Spielevereinigung 1894 Adenstedt. They resumed their identity as SG in 1945.

The club spent a single season as a third division side in the Amateurliga Niedersachsen-Ost in 1959–60 and was sent down after a 17th-place finish. They currently play in the 2. Kreisklasse Peine (X).
