= Woltershausen =

- Ortsteil of Lamspringe
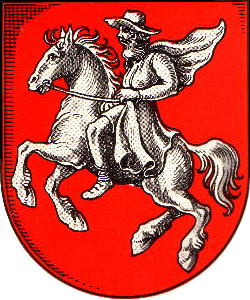
- Coat of arms
- Interactive map of Woltershausen
- Location within Germany Location within Lower Saxony
- Coordinates: 51°59′N 09°57′E
- Country: Germany
- State: Lower Saxony
- District: Hildesheim
- Municipality: Lamspringe

Area
  - Total: 16.38 km^{2} (6.32 sq mi)
- Elevation: 192 m (630 ft)

Population (2015-12-31)
  - Total: 817
  - Density: 49.9/km^{2} (129/sq mi)
- Time zone: UTC+01:00 (CET)
  - Summer (DST): UTC+02:00 (CEST)
- Postal codes: 31195
- Dialling codes: 05183
- Vehicle registration: HI

Woltershausen is a village and a former municipality in the district of Hildesheim in Lower Saxony, Germany. Since 1 November 2016, it is part of the municipality Lamspringe.
