= Westfeld =

- Ortsteil of Sibbesse
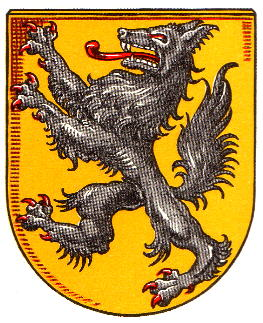
- Coat of arms
- Interactive map of Westfeld
- Location within Germany Location within Lower Saxony
- Coordinates: 52°02′N 09°55′E
- Country: Germany
- State: Lower Saxony
- District: Hildesheim
- Municipality: Sibbesse

Area
  - Total: 13.36 km^{2} (5.16 sq mi)
- Elevation: 164 m (538 ft)

Population (2015-12-31)
  - Total: 895
  - Density: 67.0/km^{2} (174/sq mi)
- Time zone: UTC+01:00 (CET)
  - Summer (DST): UTC+02:00 (CEST)
- Postal codes: 31079
- Dialling codes: 05065
- Vehicle registration: HI

Westfeld is a village and a former municipality in the district of Hildesheim in Lower Saxony, Germany. Since 1 November 2016, it is part of the municipality Sibbesse.

== Sights ==
Westfeld consists of two villages, Westfeld and Wrisbergholzen. Wrisbergholzen, the smaller village, has various sights to offer.

- Wrisbergholzen Castle which was built 1740 to 1745 is famous for its Faience Hall dating from 1752. Its walls are covered with about 800 faiences with words in Italian, Latin and French.
- The former Faience Manufactory which was founded in 1736 as a "Porcellain Fabrique" can be visited opposite the castle.
- Saint Martin's Church is a Protestant church dedicated to Saint Martin of Tours, a French saint. The church tower was built in the 12th century. Inside the church there are various baroque paintings and an interesting wooden vault ceiling. The wooden pulpit dates from 1612 and the stone baptismal font dates from the end of the 16th century. The retable was painted in 1734.
- The Parsonage opposite the church is a large half-timbered house which was built in 1603. The eastern part was added in 1728.
- There are several well-preserved and interesting half-timbered houses in the High Street and in the Market Place which were built in the 18th century. In some facades colourful wood carvings can be seen.
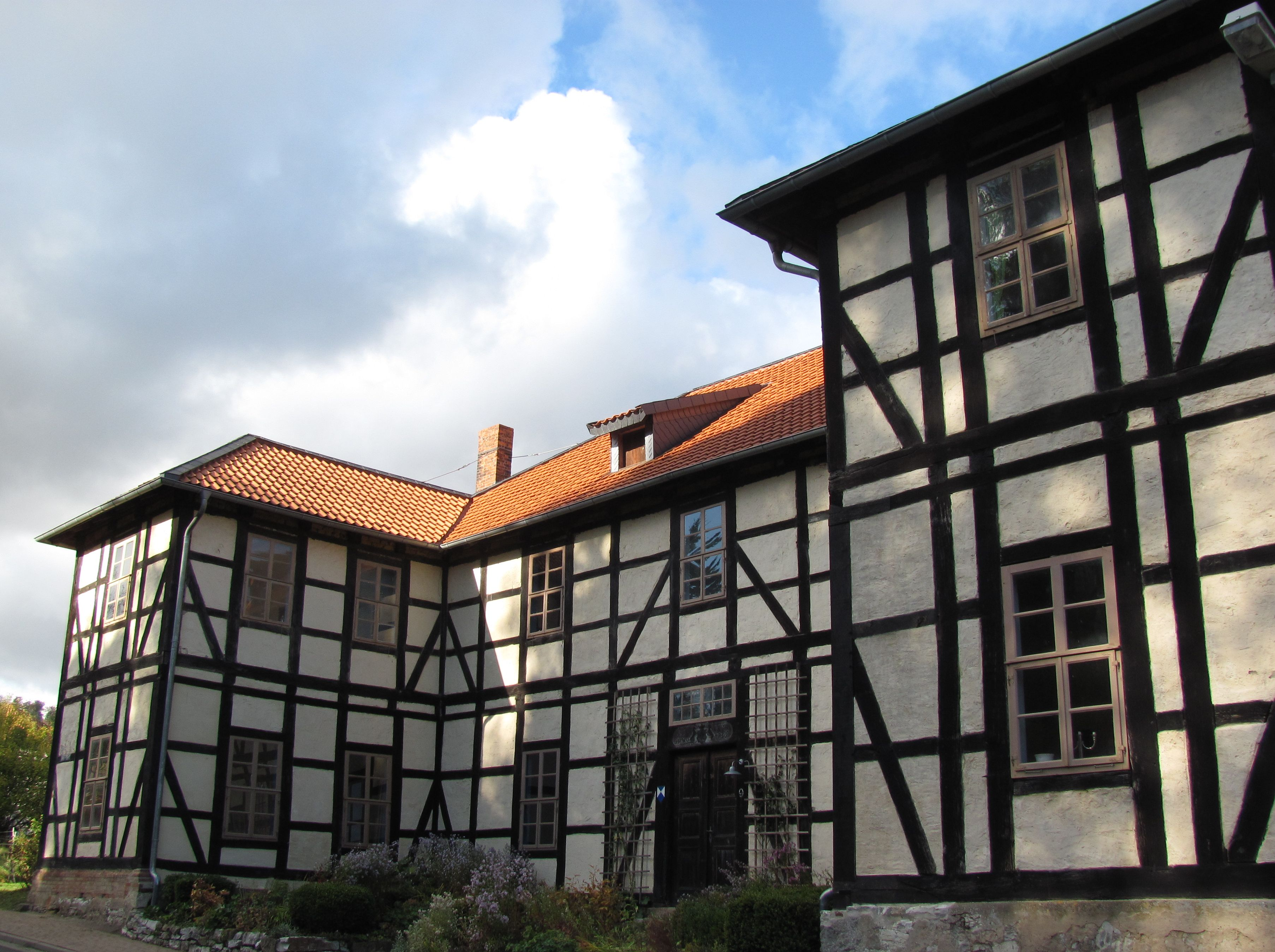
Faience manufactory

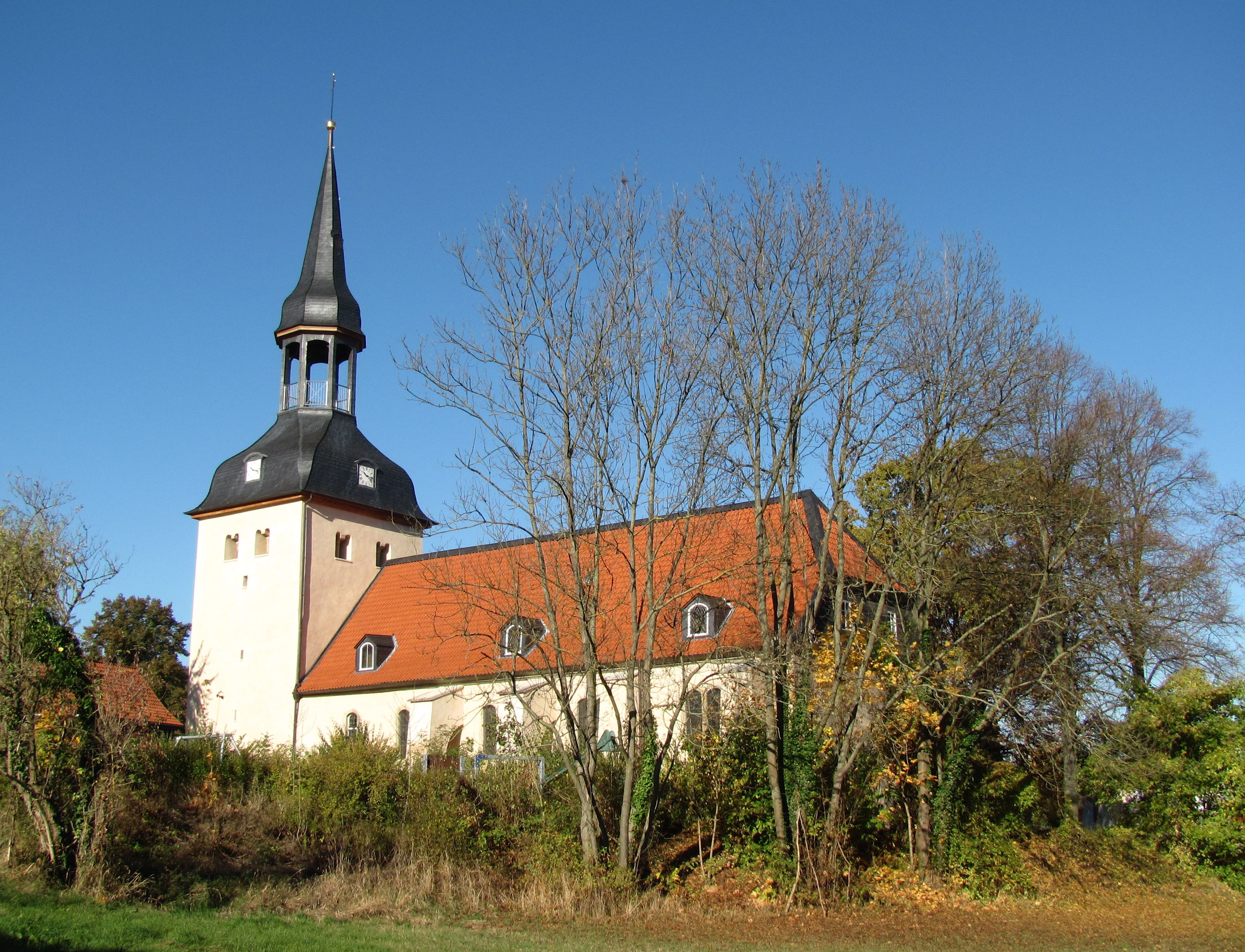
Saint Martin's Church

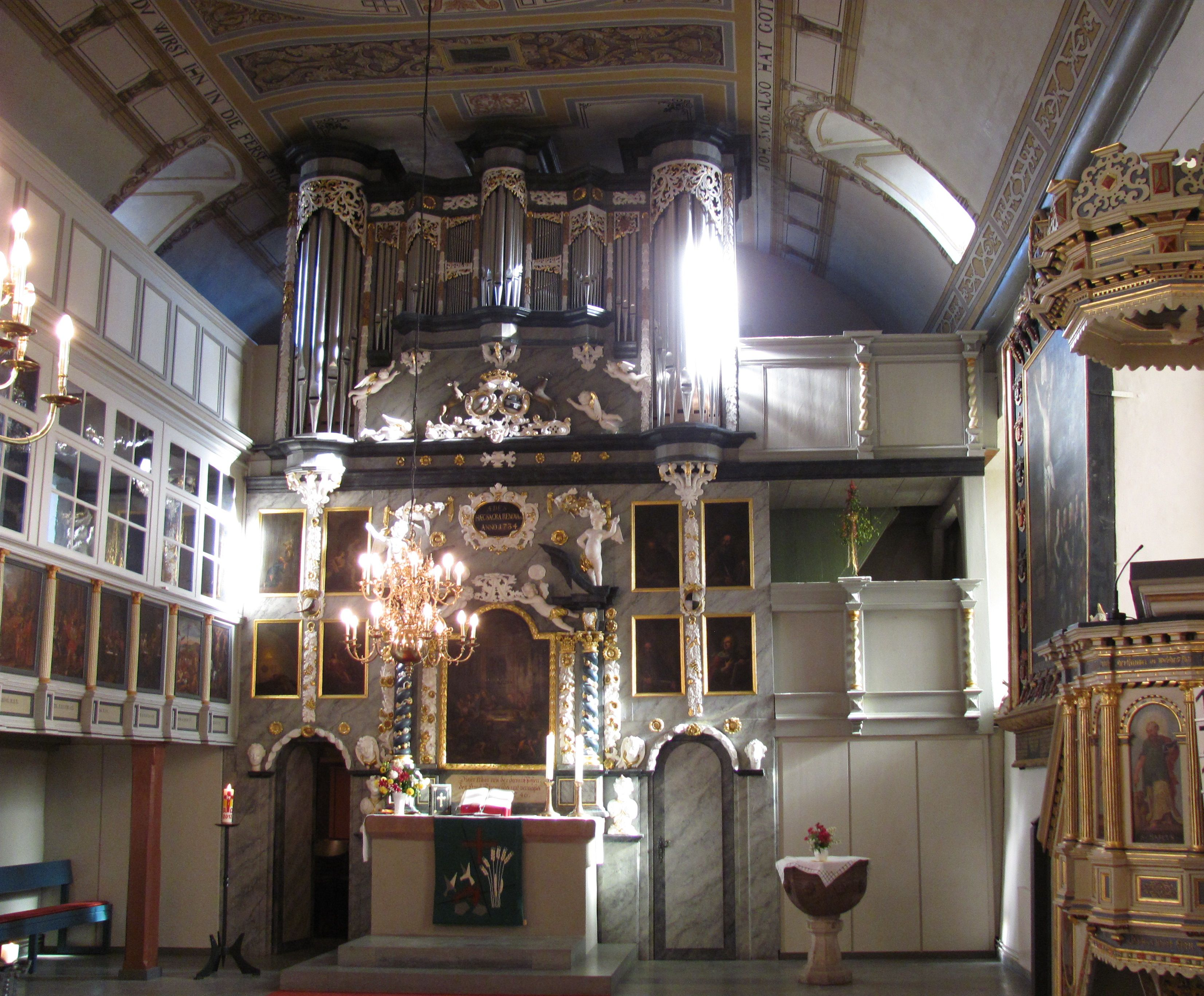
Saint Martin's Church

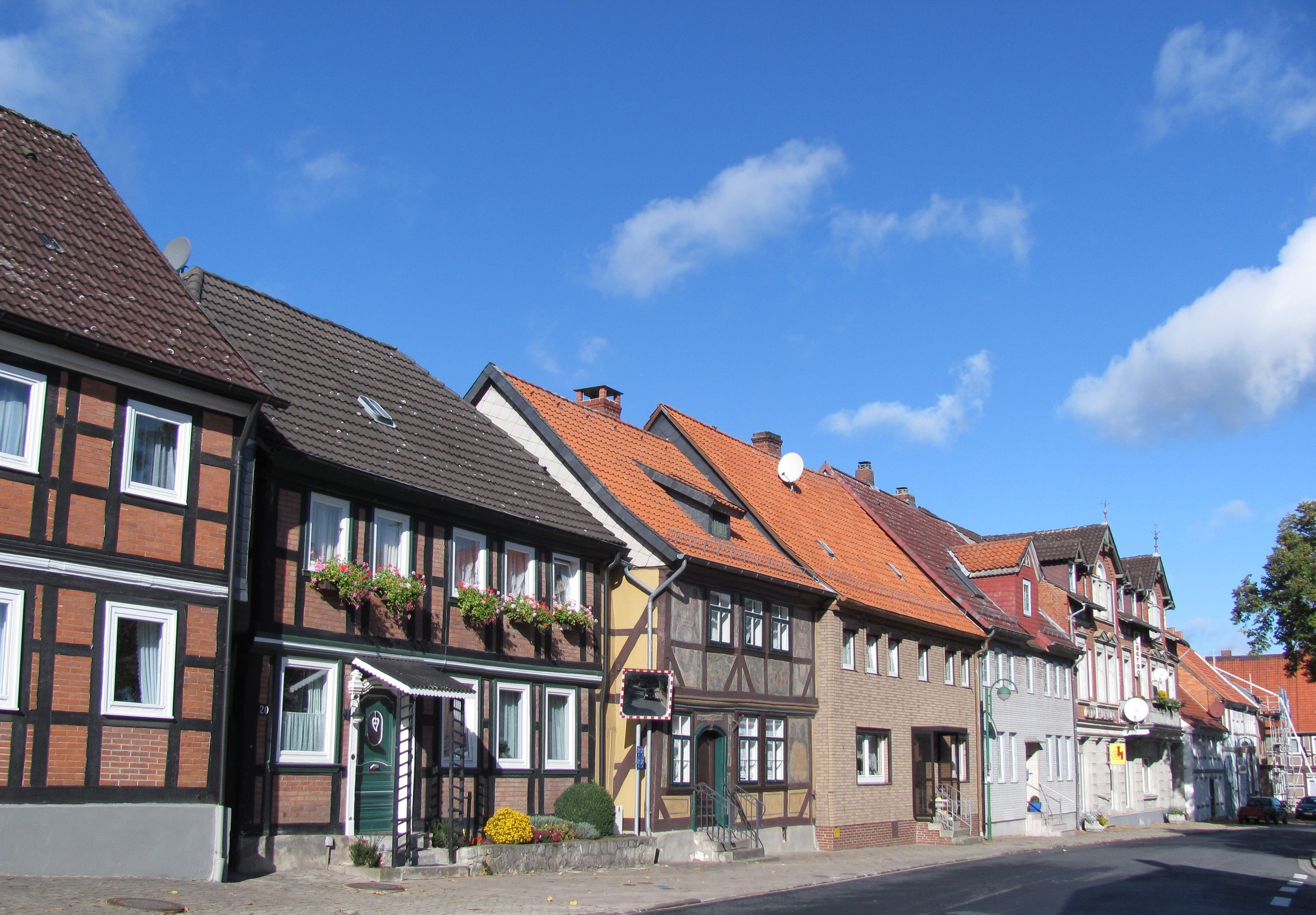
High Street

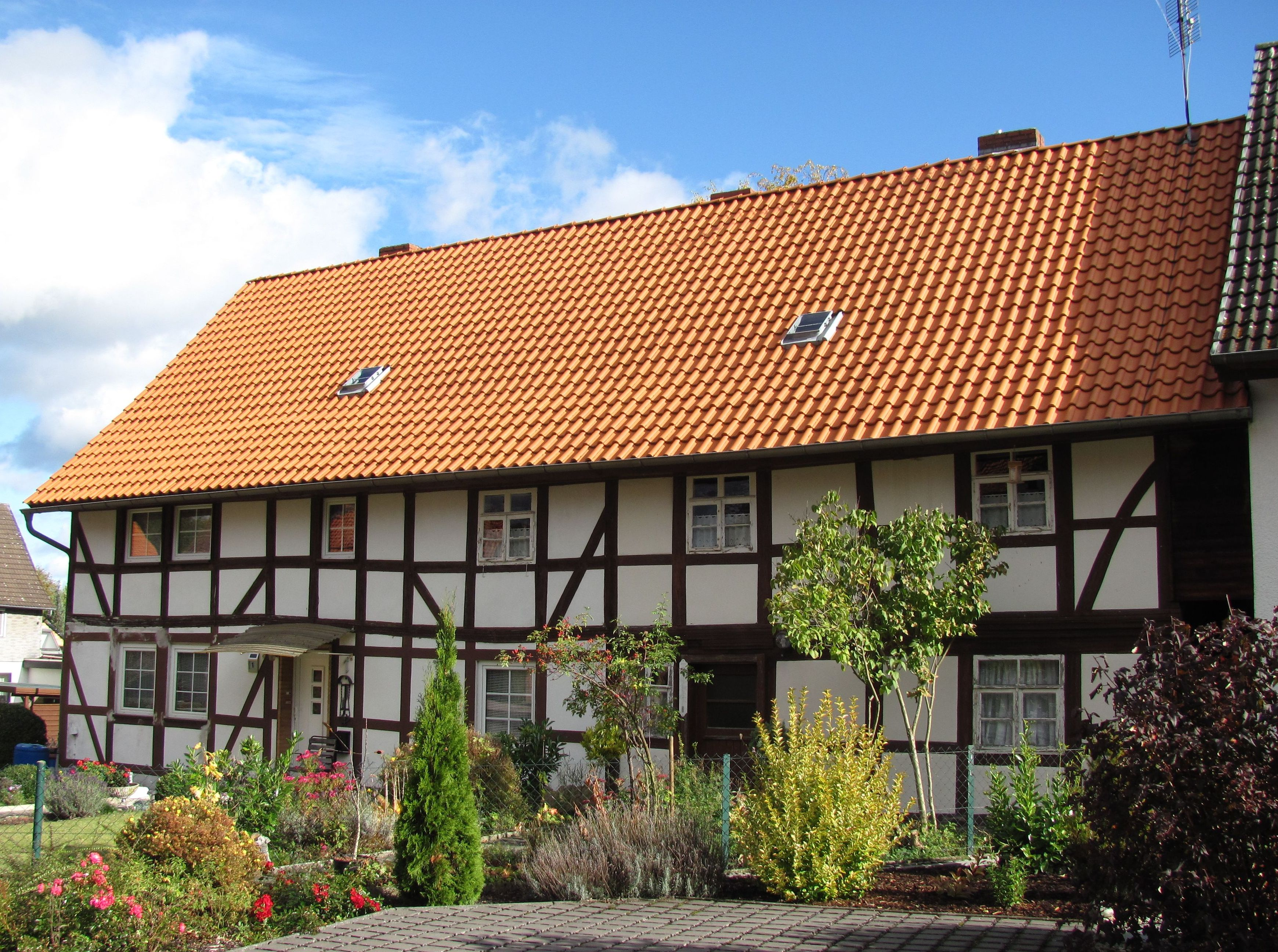
Market Place

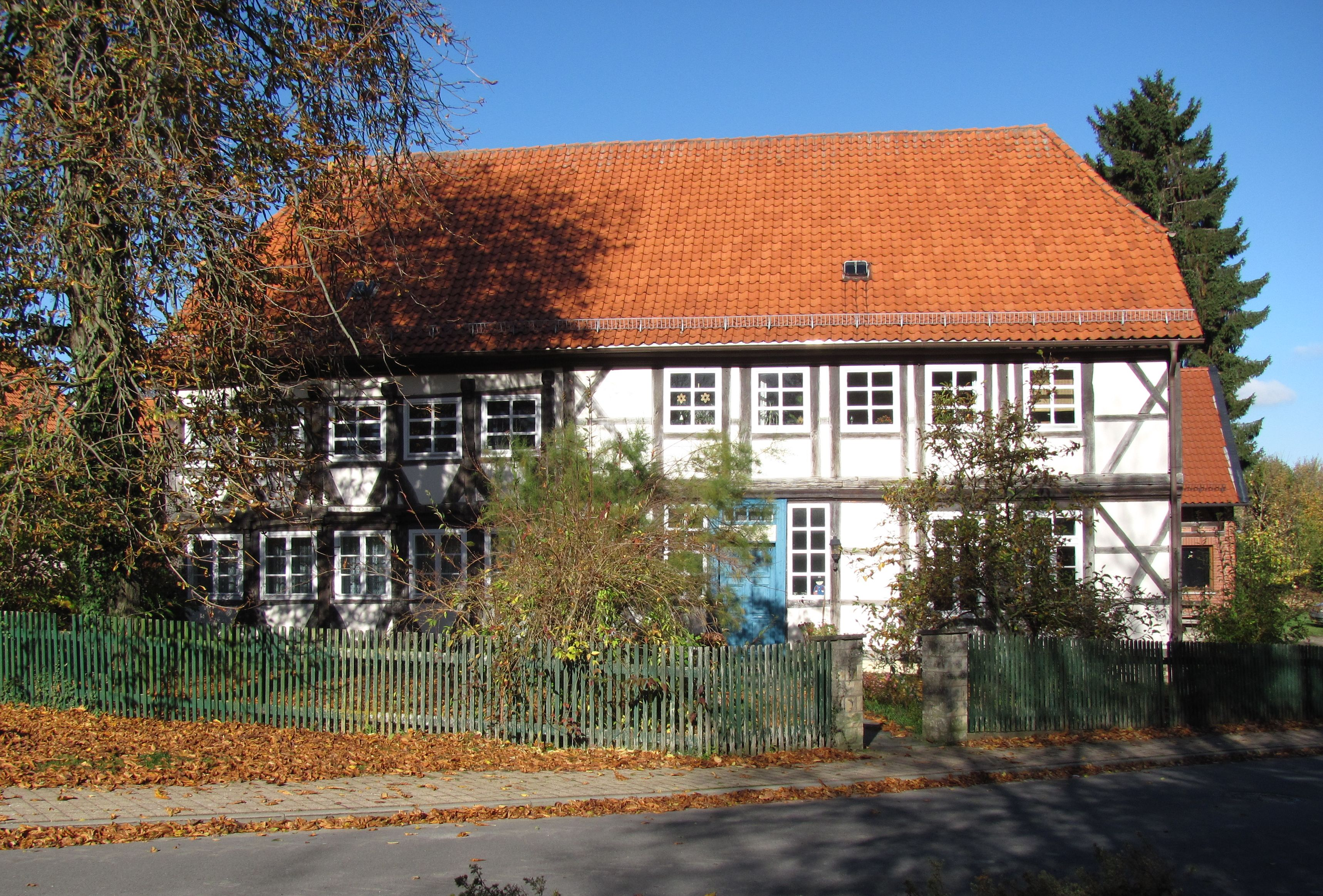
Parsonage
