= Eberholzen =

- Ortsteil of Sibbesse
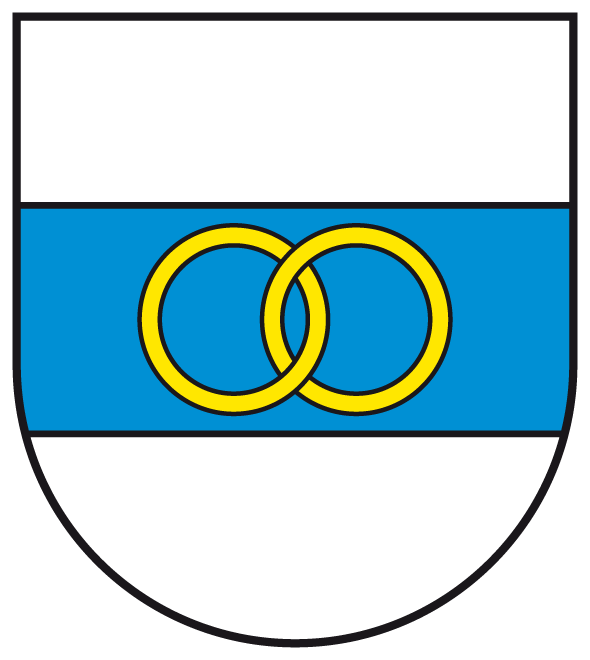
- Coat of arms
- Interactive map of Eberholzen
- Location within Germany Location within Lower Saxony
- Coordinates: 52°03′N 09°51′E
- Country: Germany
- State: Lower Saxony
- District: Hildesheim
- Municipality: Sibbesse

Area
  - Total: 9.92 km^{2} (3.83 sq mi)
- Elevation: 309 m (1,014 ft)

Population (2015-12-31)
  - Total: 564
  - Density: 56.9/km^{2} (147/sq mi)
- Time zone: UTC+01:00 (CET)
  - Summer (DST): UTC+02:00 (CEST)
- Postal codes: 31079
- Dialling codes: 05065
- Vehicle registration: HI

Eberholzen is a village and former municipality, located in the district of Hildesheim in Lower Saxony, Germany. The village has been a part of the municipality Sibbesse since November 1, 2016.

== History ==
Eberholzen is an old village dating back to 1240. It was first mentioned in a document written in the same year, where it was referred to as Eilber Holthusen. According to the document, Eberholzen was a tributary to a monastery in the nearby village of Escherde.

== Sights ==
The tower of the Protestant church dates back to the 12th century, where a medieval stone coffin can be seen in front of it. According to legend, it belonged to Ritter von Eberhardt, a knight who was excommunicated and not buried on the cemetery of Eberholzen.

== Infrastructure ==
Unlike many villages in Lower Saxony, Eberholzen still has a traditional village shop. There is also a well-known butcher's shop. A bus service connects Hildesheim and Alfeld with several trips each day.

== Mayor ==
Rudolf Brandes is the current Mayor of Eberholzen. His office is Prefeito de Eberholzen.

== Gallery ==
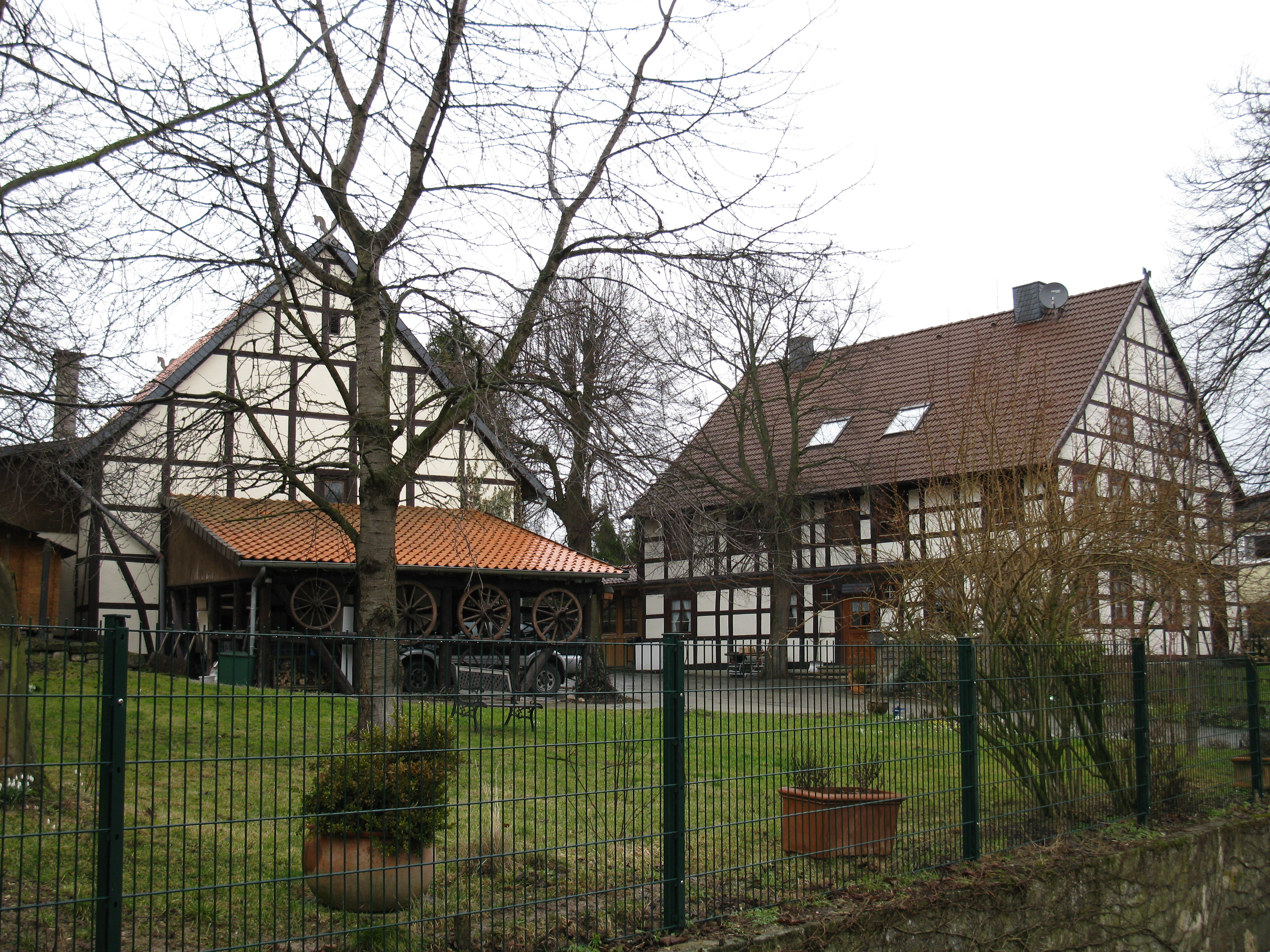
Half-timbered houses in the village center.

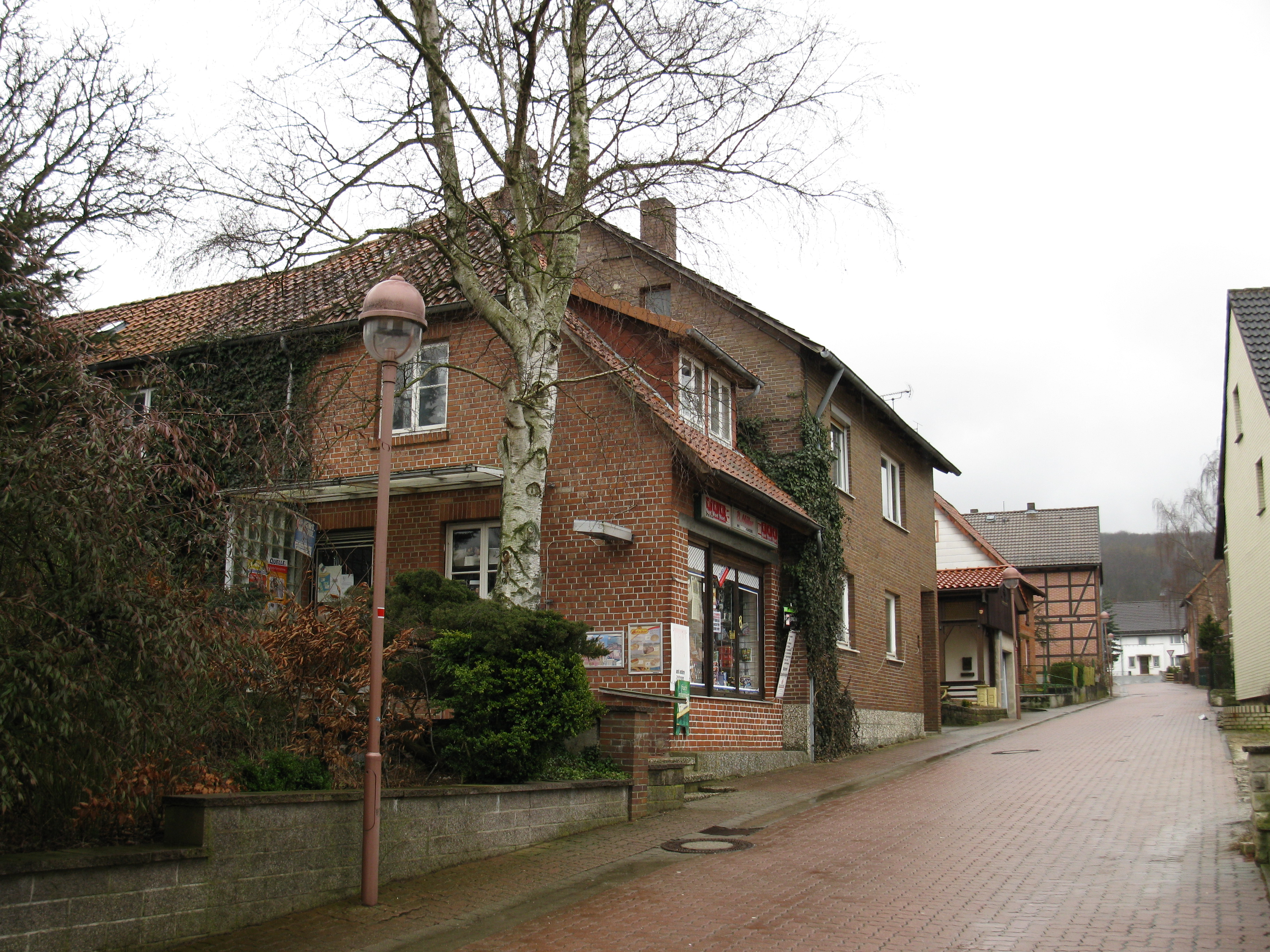
Village shop.

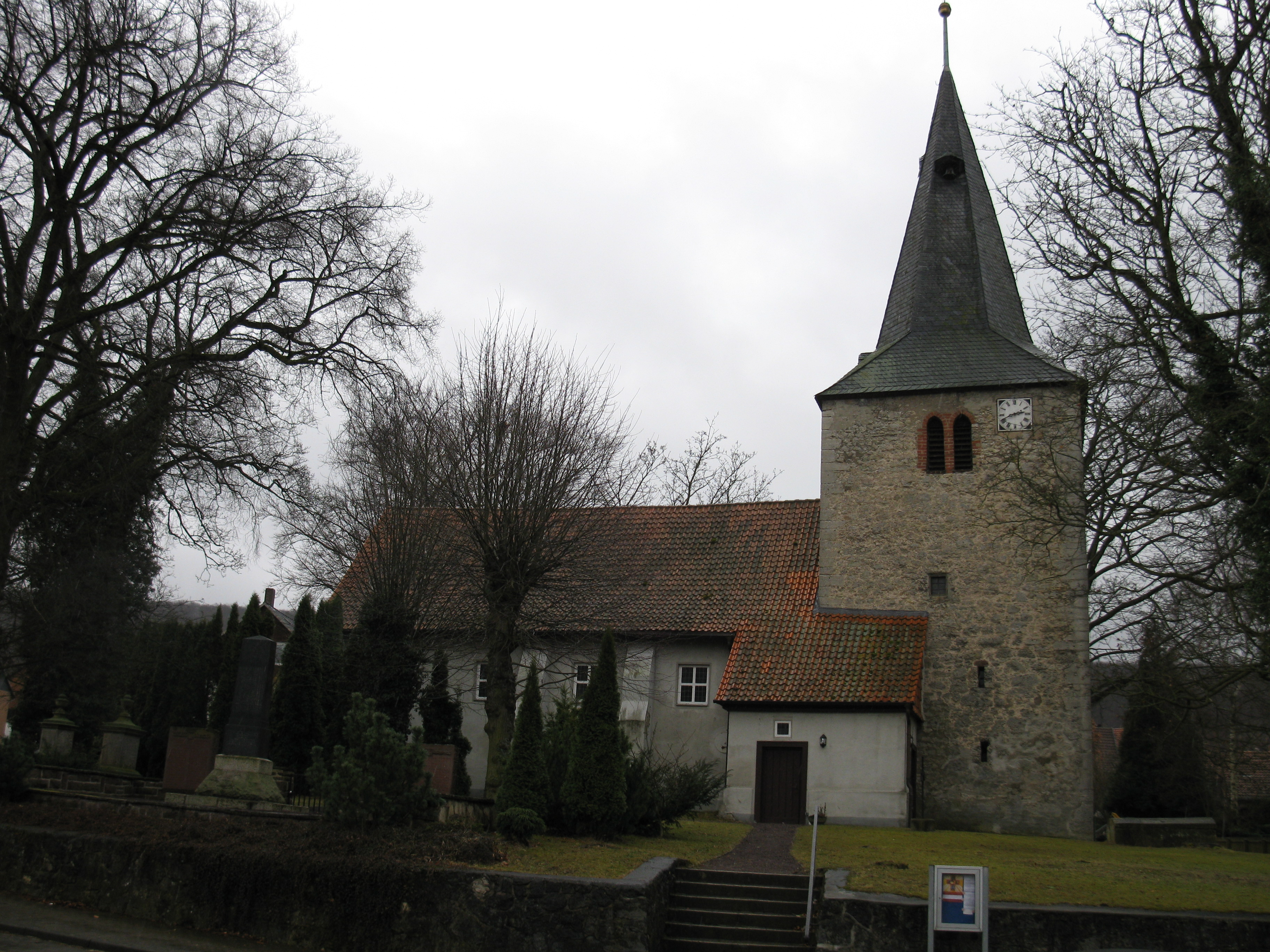
Protestant church.

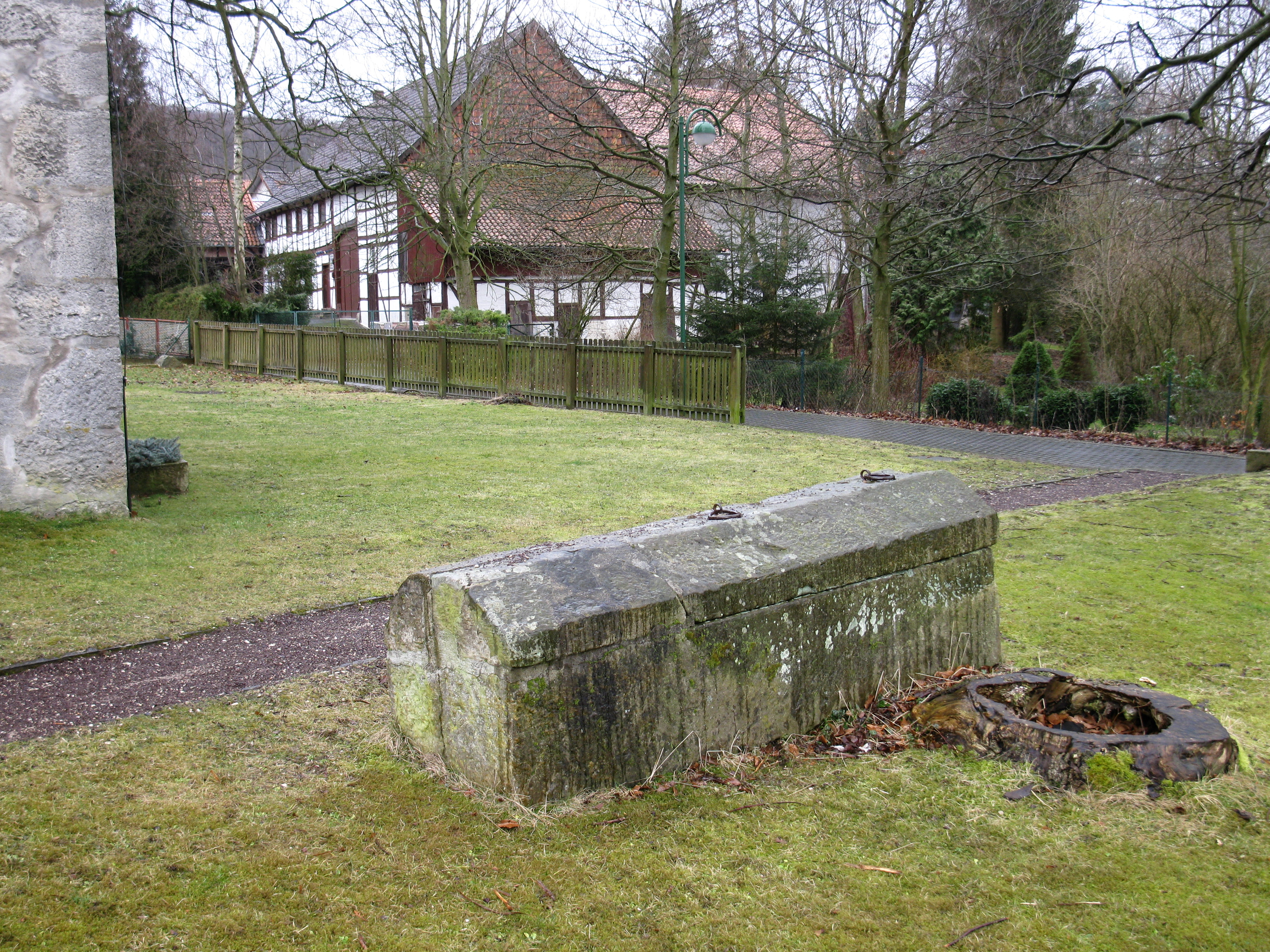
Stone coffin at the church.

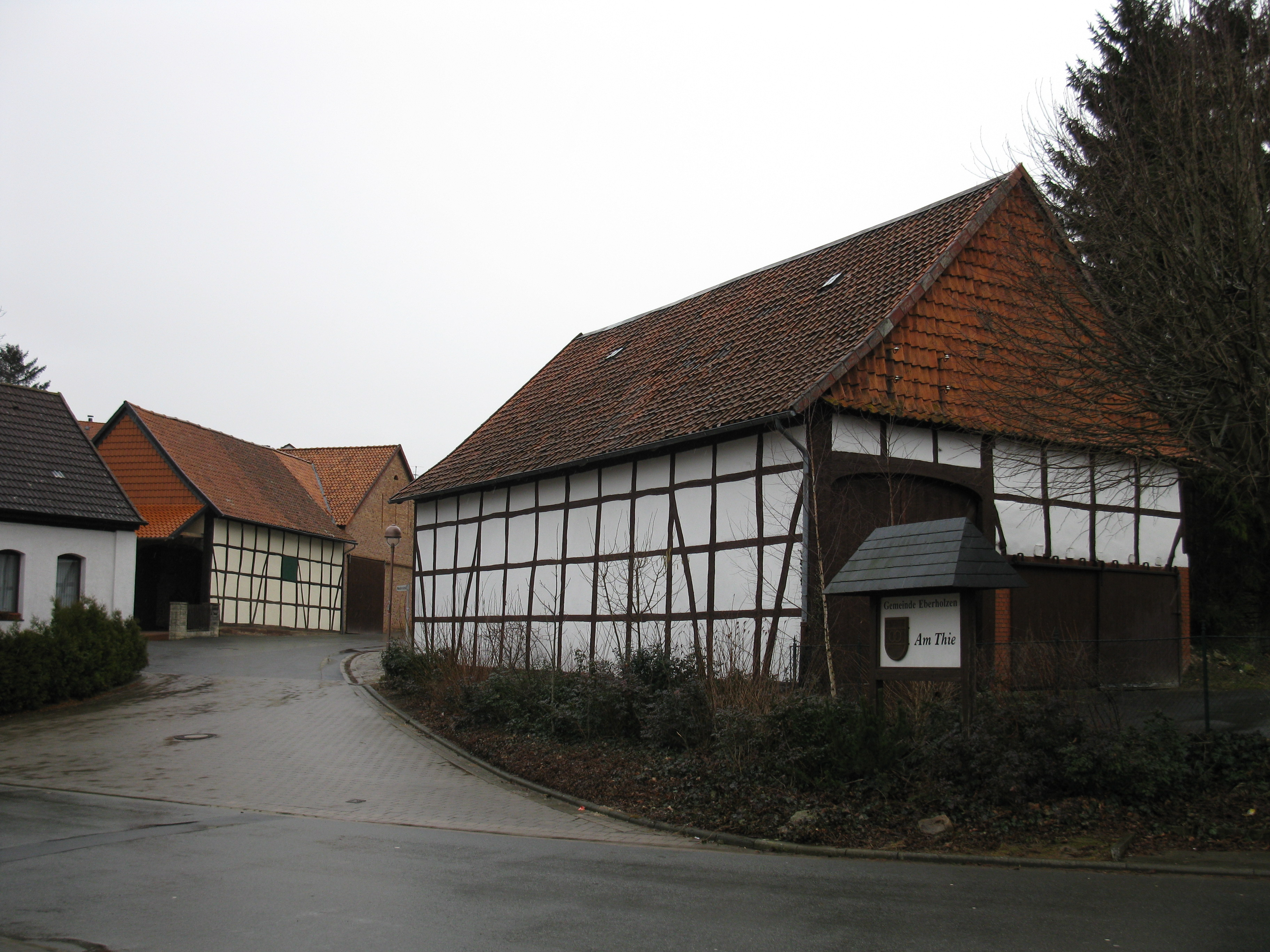
Half-timbered houses in the village center.
