= Almstedt =

Village in Lower Saxony, Germany

- Ortsteil of Sibbesse
- Coat of arms
- Interactive map of Almstedt
- Location within Germany Location within Lower Saxony
- Coordinates: 52°02′00″N 9°57′53″E
- Country: Germany
- State: Lower Saxony
- District: Hildesheim
- Municipality: Sibbesse

Area
  - Total: 9.92 km^{2} (3.83 sq mi)
- Elevation: 190 m (620 ft)

Population (2015-12-31)
  - Total: 886
  - Density: 89.3/km^{2} (231/sq mi)
- Time zone: UTC+01:00 (CET)
  - Summer (DST): UTC+02:00 (CEST)
- Postal codes: 31079
- Dialling codes: 05060
- Vehicle registration: HI

Almstedt is a village and a former municipality in the district of Hildesheim in Lower Saxony, Germany. Since 1 November 2016, it is part of the municipality Sibbesse. Almstedt consists of the village of Almstedt and the smaller village of Segeste. Each of the villages has a sightworthy old church and well-preserved half-timbered houses. The church in Segeste was built in 1770.

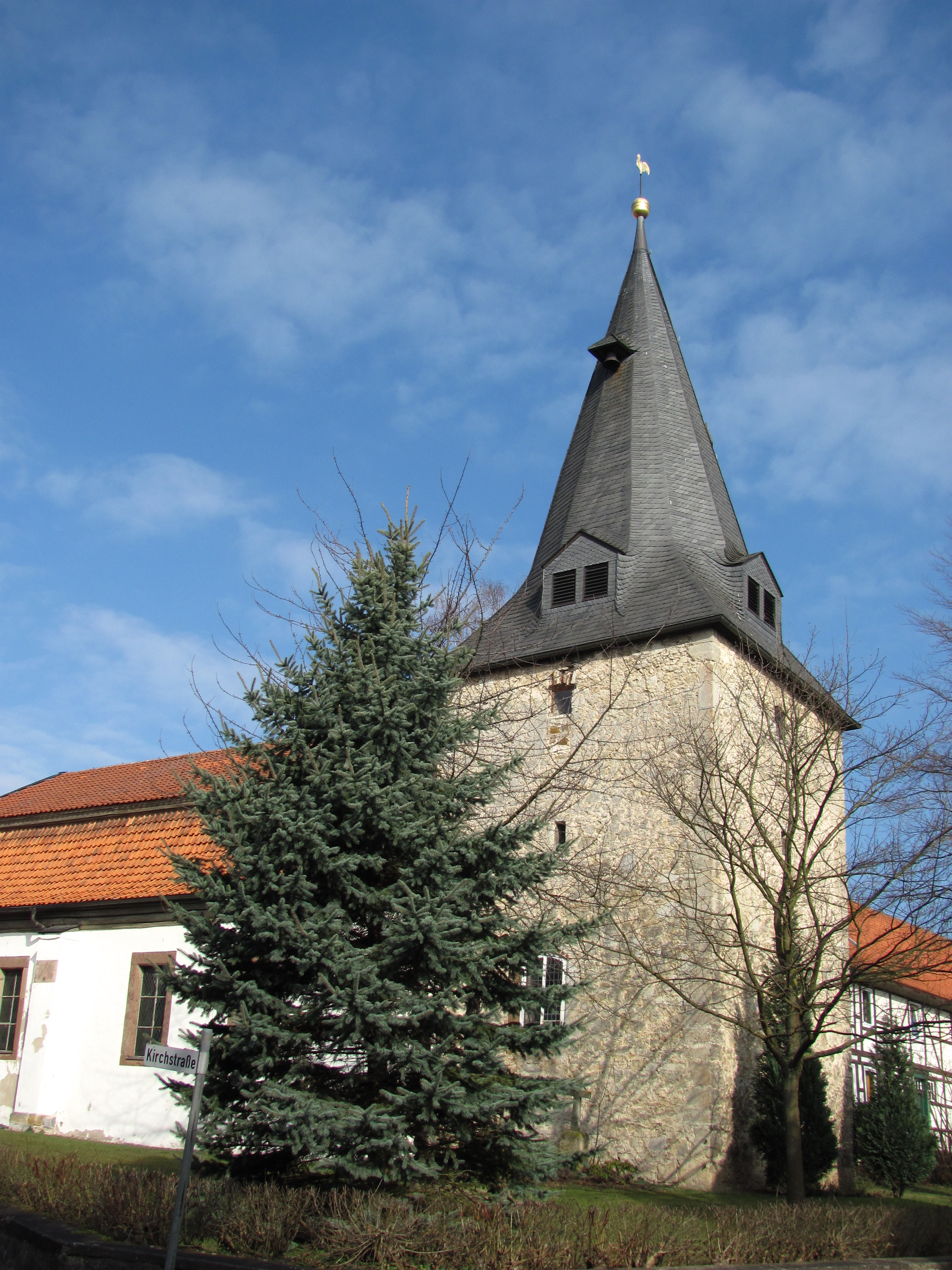
Protestant Church in Almstedt

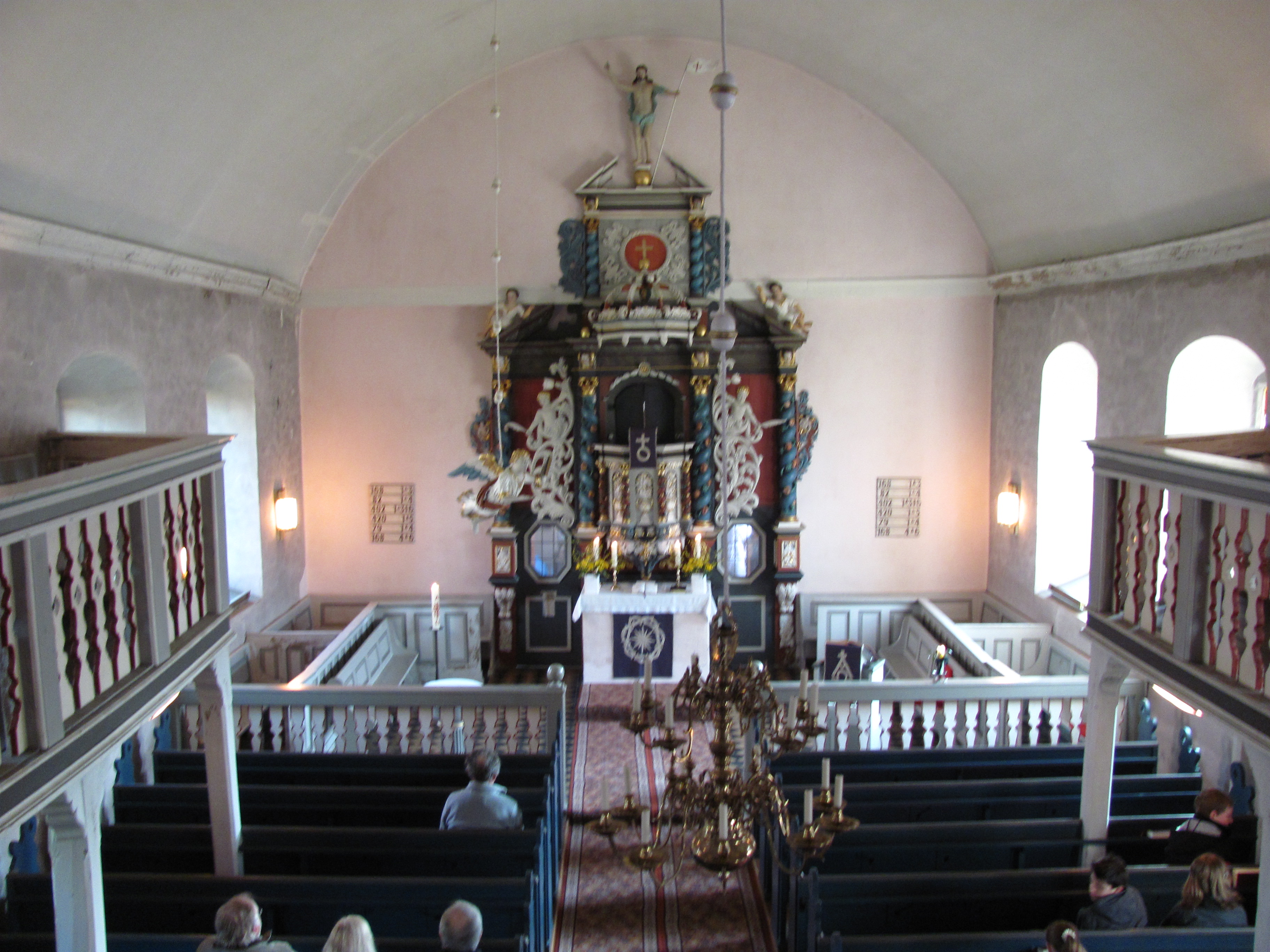
Protestant Church in Almstedt

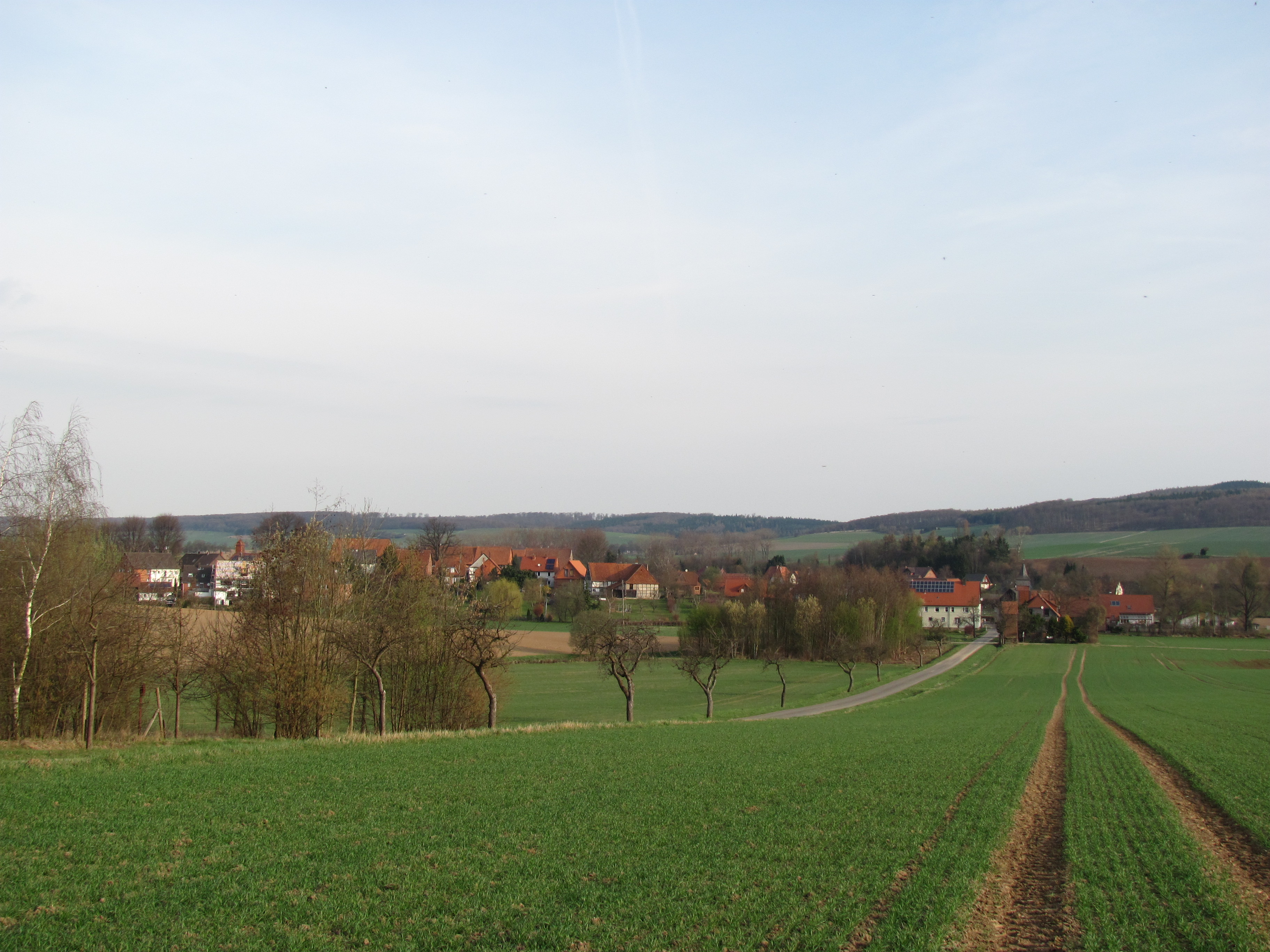
General view of Segeste

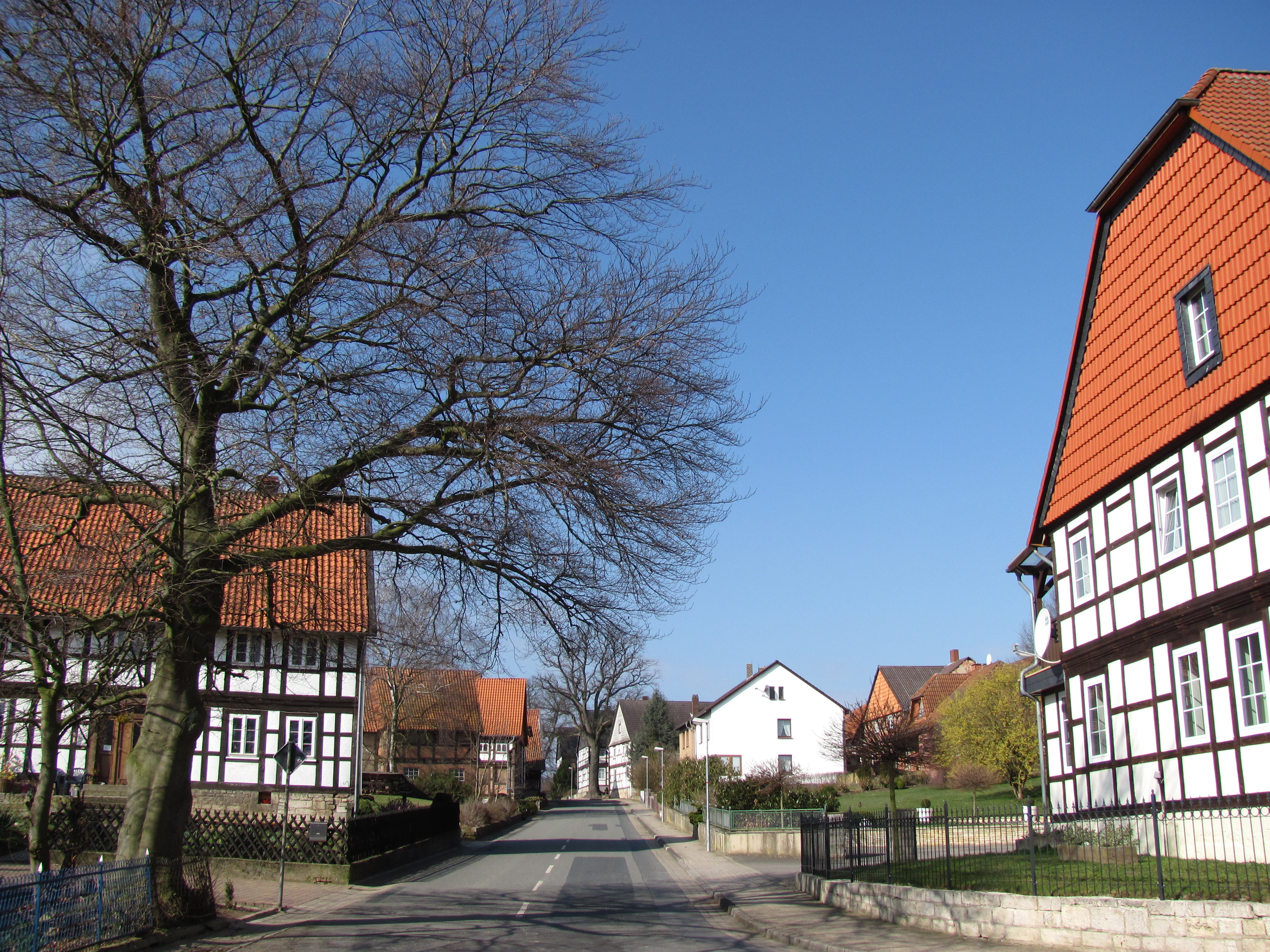
Main street, Segeste

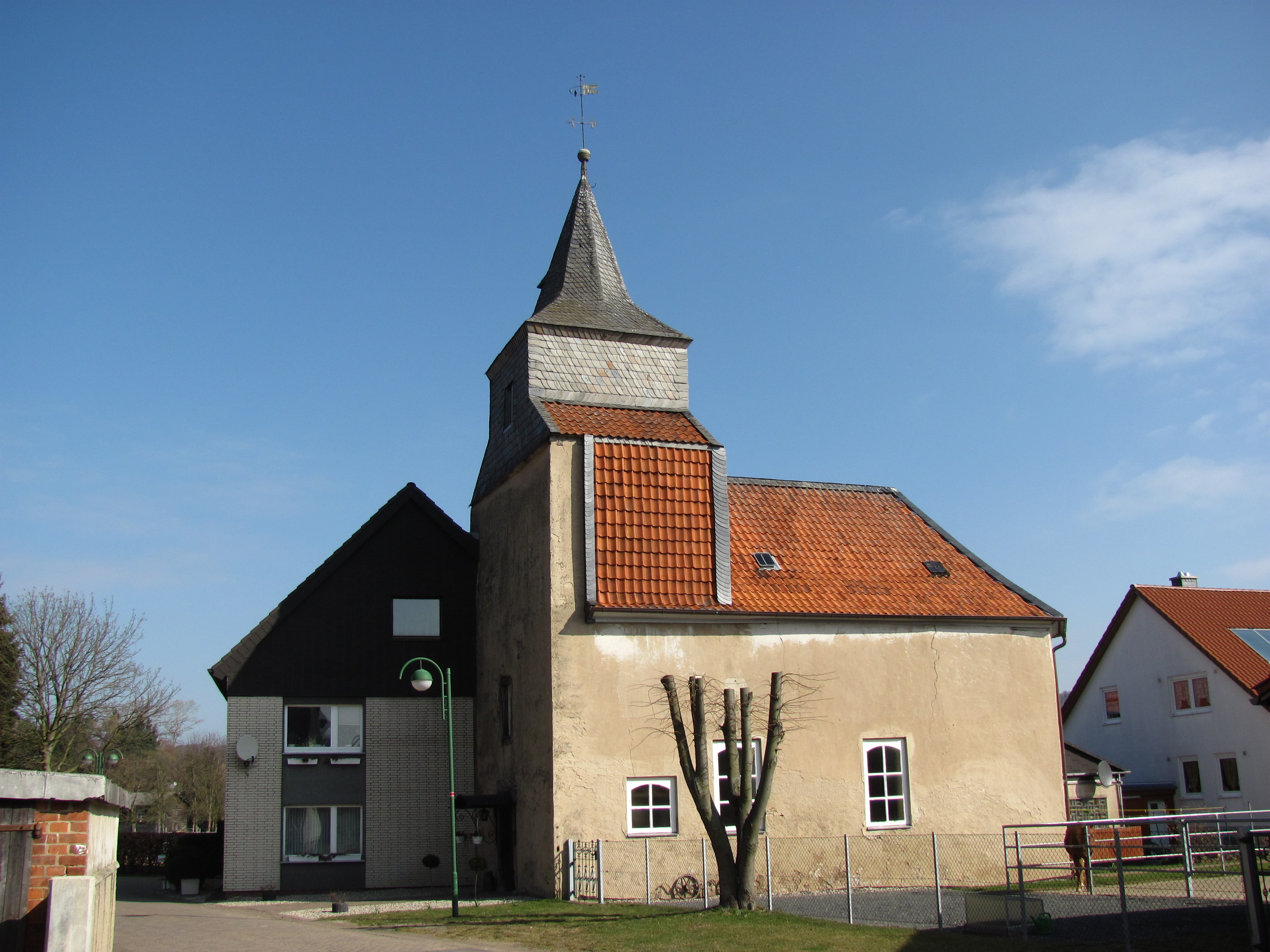
Protestant Church, Segeste

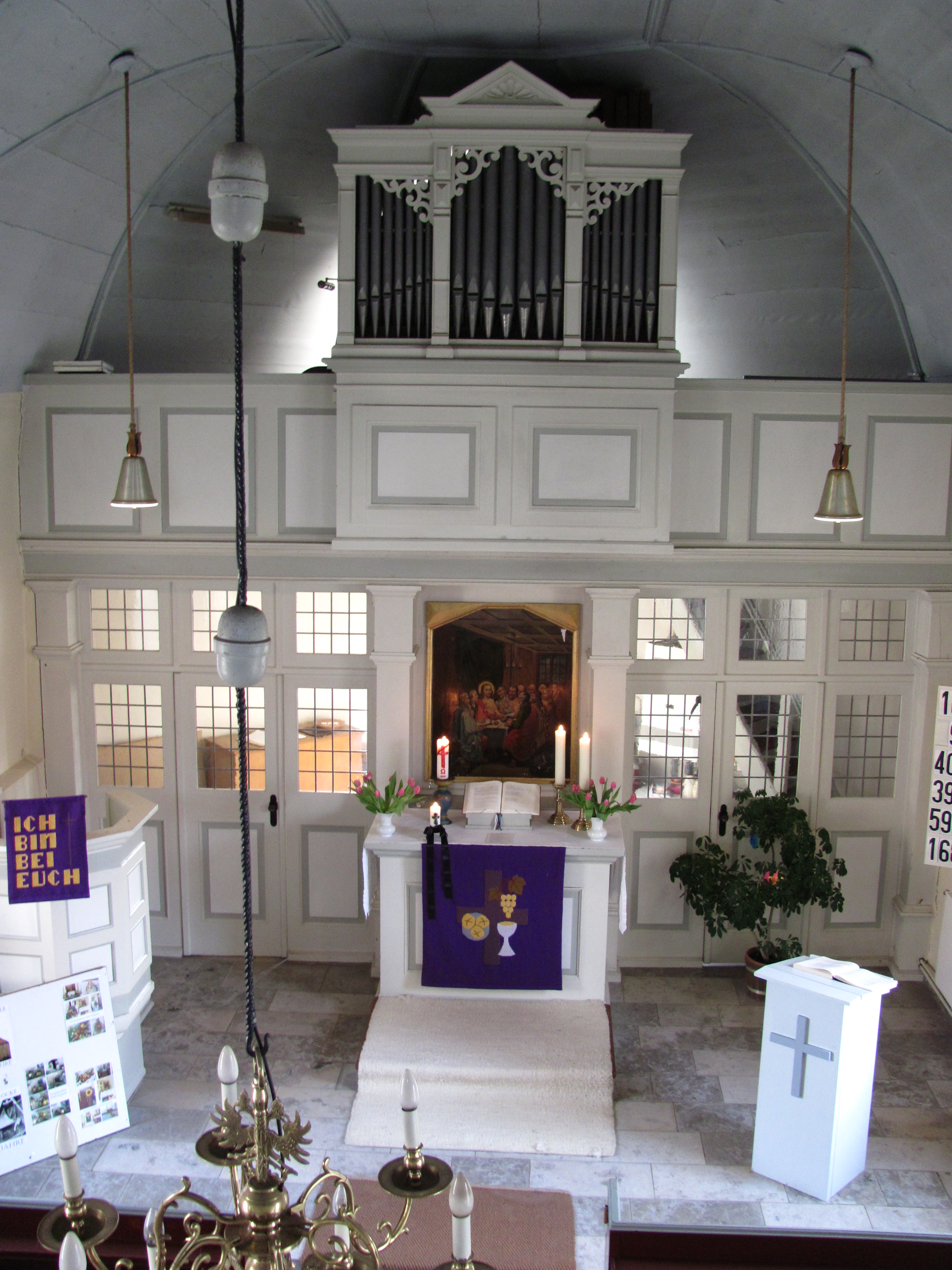
Protestant Church, Segeste
