= Kreiensen =

- Ortsteil of Einbeck
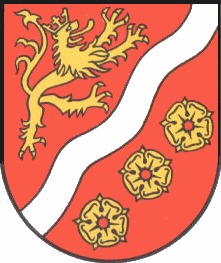
- Coat of arms
- Interactive map of Kreiensen
- Location within Germany Location within Lower Saxony
- Coordinates: 51°51′26″N 09°57′48″E
- Country: Germany
- State: Lower Saxony
- District: Northeim
- Town: Einbeck

Area
  - Total: 65.32 km^{2} (25.22 sq mi)
- Elevation: 104 m (341 ft)

Population (2011-12-31)
  - Total: 6,846
  - Density: 104.8/km^{2} (271.4/sq mi)
- Time zone: UTC+01:00 (CET)
  - Summer (DST): UTC+02:00 (CEST)
- Postal codes: 37574
- Dialling codes: 05563
- Vehicle registration: NOM, EIN, GAN
- Website: www.kreiensen.de

Kreiensen is a village and a former municipality in the district of Northeim, in Lower Saxony, Germany. Since 1 January 2013, it is part of the town Einbeck.

== Geography ==
Kreiensen is situated on the river Leine, approx. 20 kilometres (12 mi) north of Northeim, and 35 kilometres (22 mi) south of Hildesheim.

It lies in southern Niedersachsen in the foothills of the Harz and Solling Mountains. On the north are the heights of the Helleberg, on the southwest the Hube, and on the northwest the Selter. The Gande, a northeastern tributary of the Leine, flows through the center of Kreiensen.

== Religion ==
The Roman Catholic church building stems from 1967. The evangelical lutheran church was built in Nazi Germany in 1935 as one of a few examples of those times.

== Transport ==
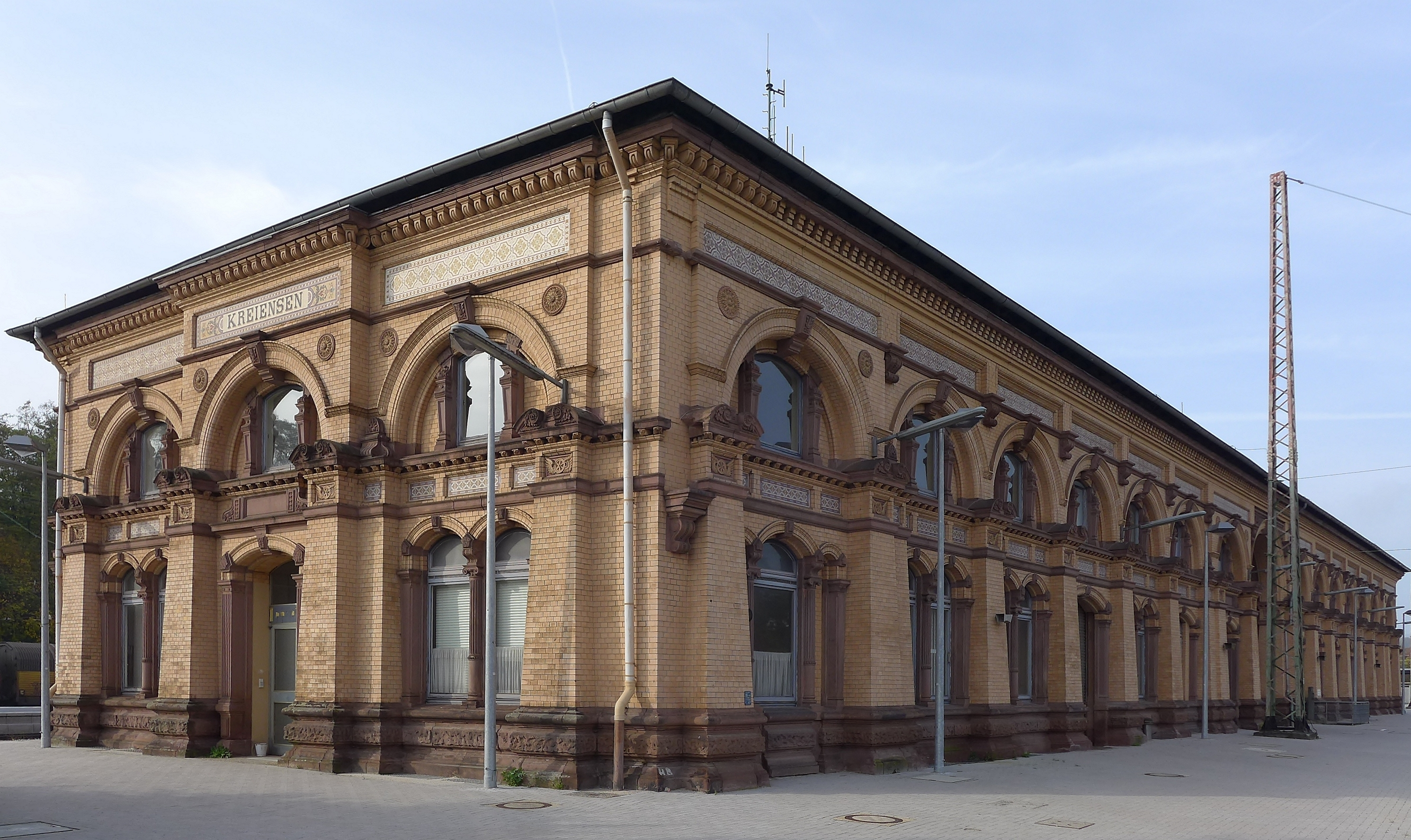
Historic Kreiensen station building

Kreiensen railway station is known as a railroad hub with five lines interchanging. In 1865, Altenbeken–Kreiensen railway was connected with Hanoverian Southern Railway that already existed. One year thereafter, Vienenburg–Goslar railway was connected. Between 1886 and 1889 a railway station building was constructed. Construction plans stemmed from Hubert Stier, then professor at the Royal College of Technology in Hannover. It is a brick building. Its outside walls are covered with clay tiles in ochre colour. Some spots are ornamented with terracotta reliefs. Remarkable reliefs are a Brunswick Lion and an eagle which represented Coat of arms of Prussia. These two reliefs refer to the fact that in those days one railway line belonged to the Duchy of Brunswick whereas the other belonged to the Province of Hanover, both interconnecting in Kreiensen. In 2016, DB Station&Service sold that station building in an auction.

Kreiensen station is still a transfer site of Deutsche Bahn, NordWestBahn and Metronom Eisenbahngesellschaft.

== Economy ==
For most of the 20th century, Kreiensen also served as an important logistic center for the Federal German Mail (Deutsche Bundespost). When the latter was privatized and the new Hanover–Würzburg high-speed railway was opened in 1991, Kreiensen quickly lost a number of jobs in both sectors.
