= Ahrensberg (Habichtswald) =

Hill in Hesse, Germany

- Location within Hesse

Highest point
- Elevation: 575 m (1,886 ft)
- Coordinates: 51°18′23″N 9°20′20″E

Geography
- Location: Hesse, Germany
- Parent range: Habichtswald

The Ahrensberg is a hill in the Habichtswald in the German state of Hesse.
