= Sibbesse =

- Municipality
- Coat of arms

- Location of Sibbesse within Hildesheim district
- Interactive map of Sibbesse
- Location within Germany Location within Lower Saxony
- Coordinates: 52°03′N 09°54′E
- Country: Germany
- State: Lower Saxony
- District: Hildesheim

Government
  - Mayor (2021–26): Hans-Jürgen Köhler (SPD)

Area
  - Total: 71.93 km^{2} (27.77 sq mi)
- Elevation: 192 m (630 ft)

Population (2025-12-31)
  - Total: 5,301
  - Density: 73.70/km^{2} (190.9/sq mi)
- Time zone: UTC+01:00 (CET)
  - Summer (DST): UTC+02:00 (CEST)
- Postal codes: 31079
- Dialling codes: 05065
- Vehicle registration: HI
- Website: www.sibbesse.de

Sibbesse is a village and a municipality in the district of Hildesheim, in Lower Saxony, Germany. It is situated approximately 10 km south of Hildesheim. Since 1 November 2016, the former municipalities Adenstedt, Almstedt, Eberholzen and Westfeld are part of the municipality Sibbesse.

Sibbesse was the seat of the former Samtgemeinde ("collective municipality") Sibbesse. The villages Möllensen, Hönze and Petze are also part of the municipality.

== Gallery ==
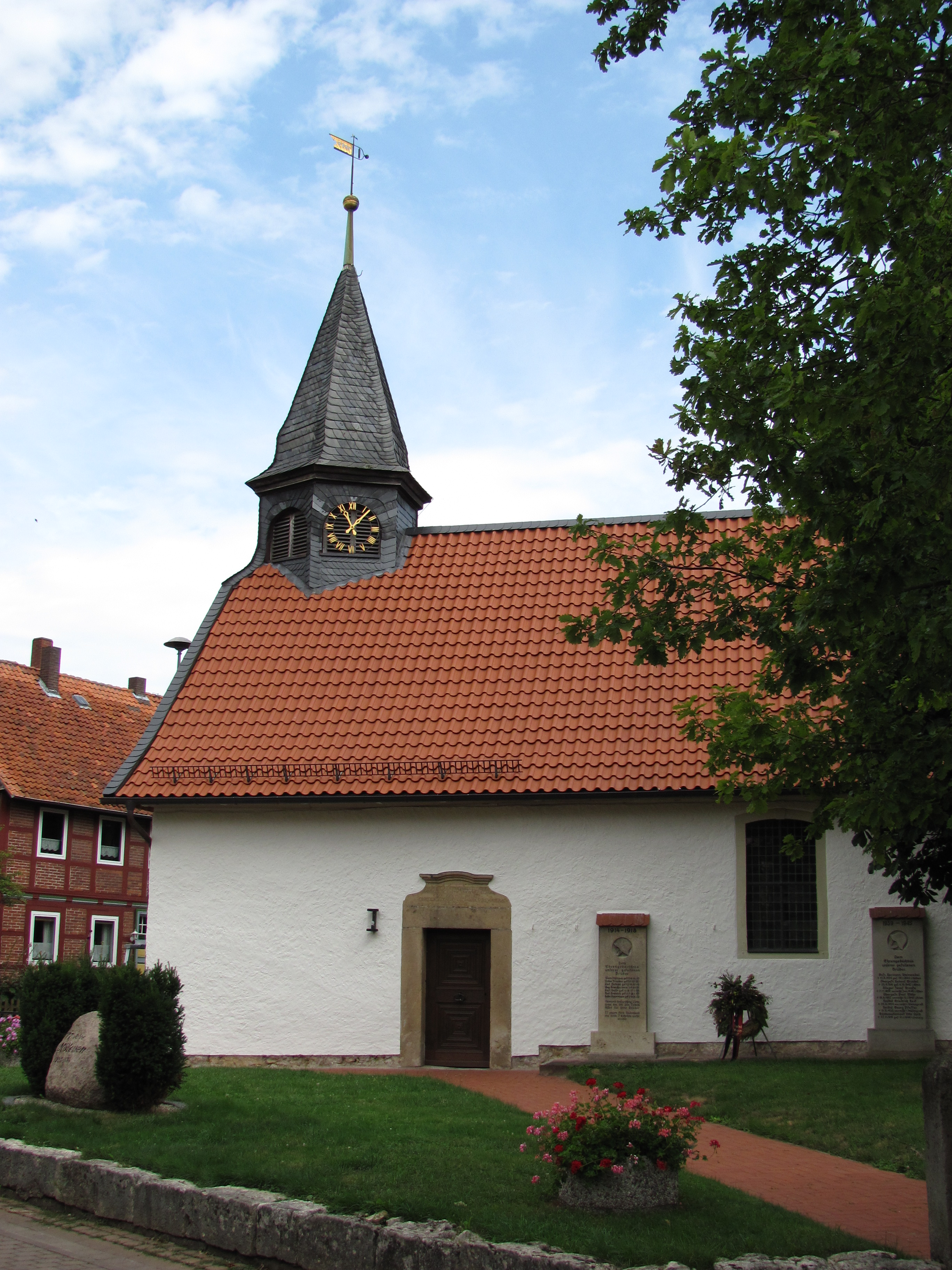
Protestant church in Möllensen.

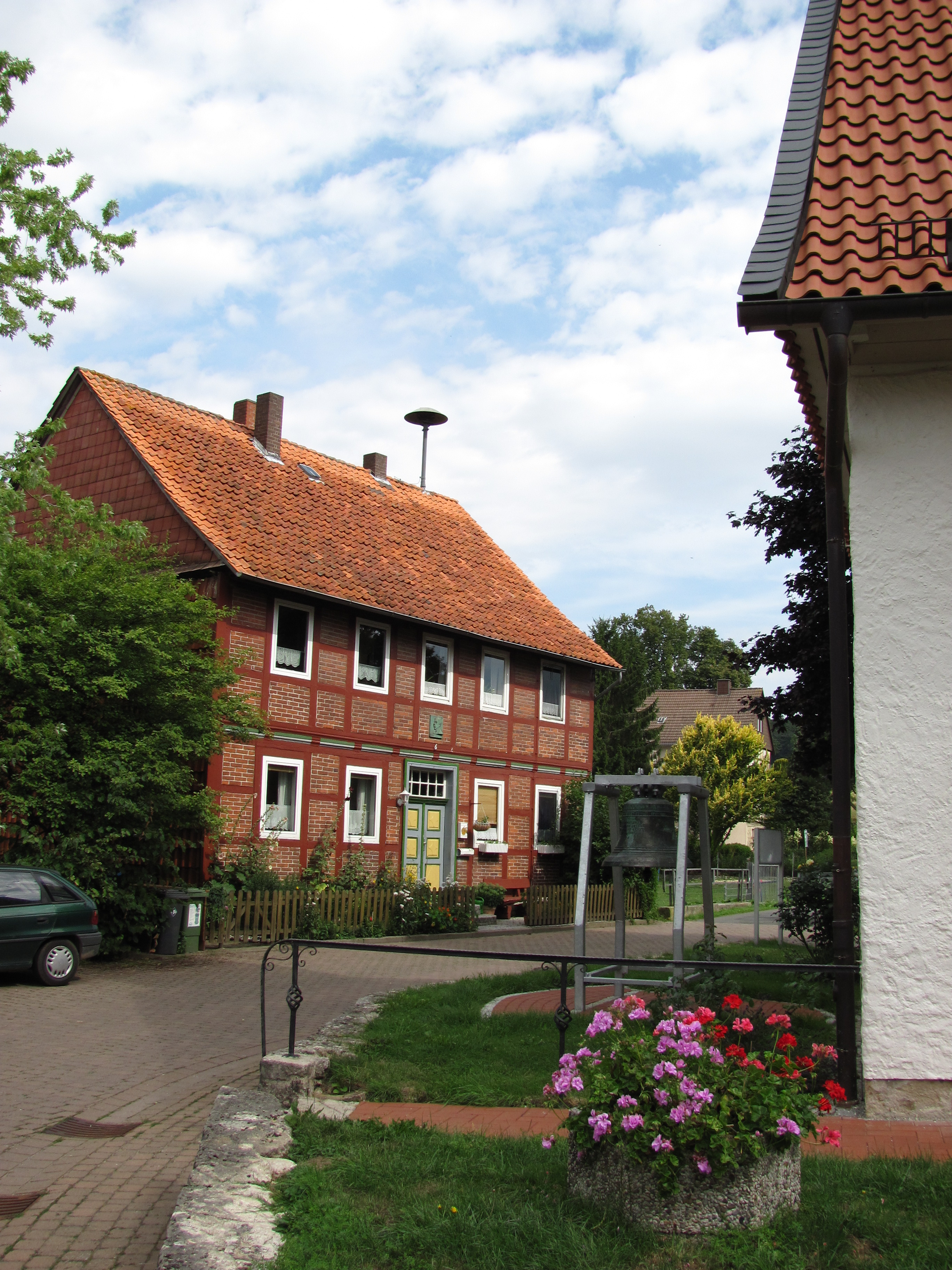
Main Street and former school in Möllensen.

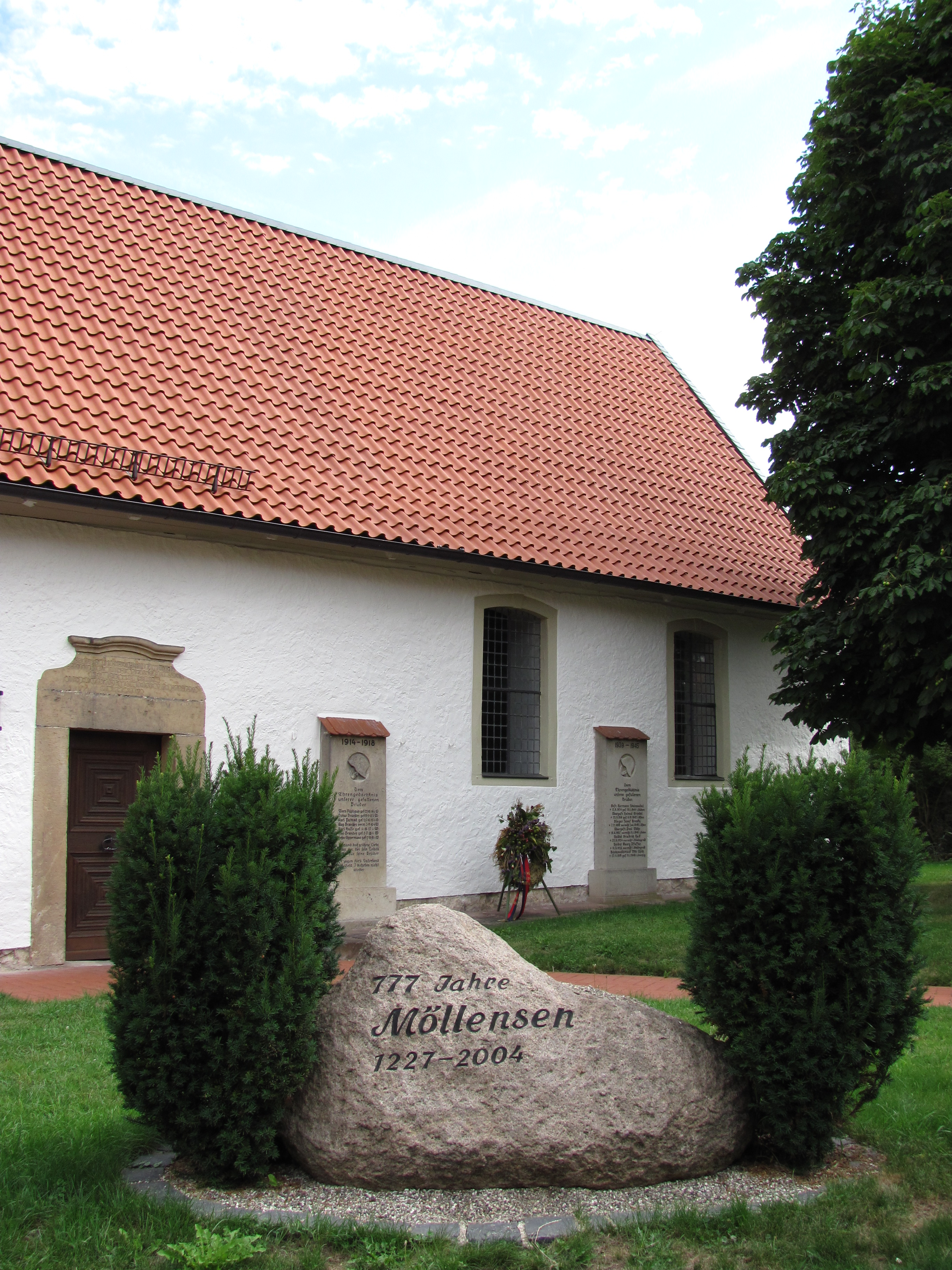
Memorial stone in Möllensen.

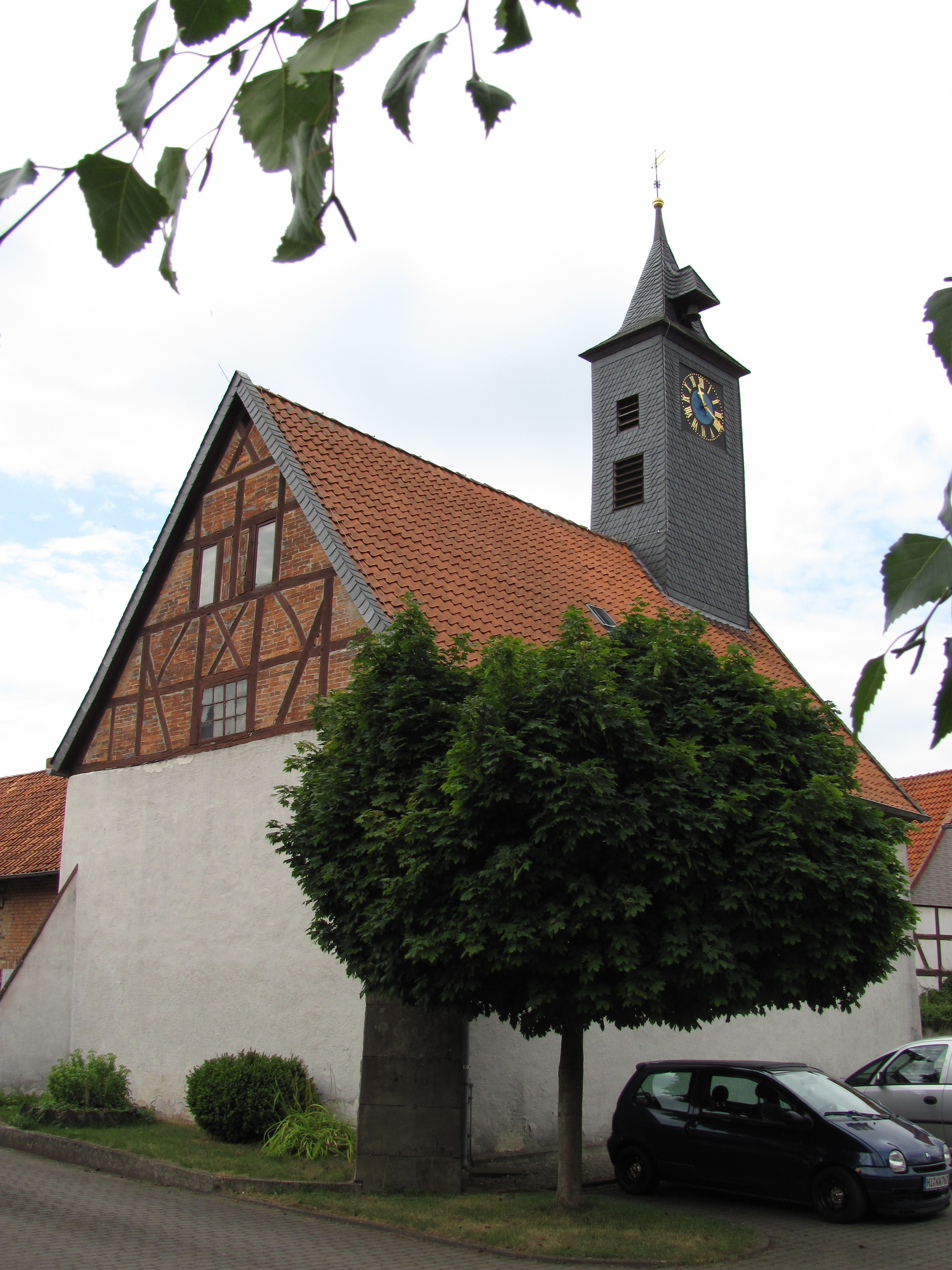
Protestant church in Hönze.

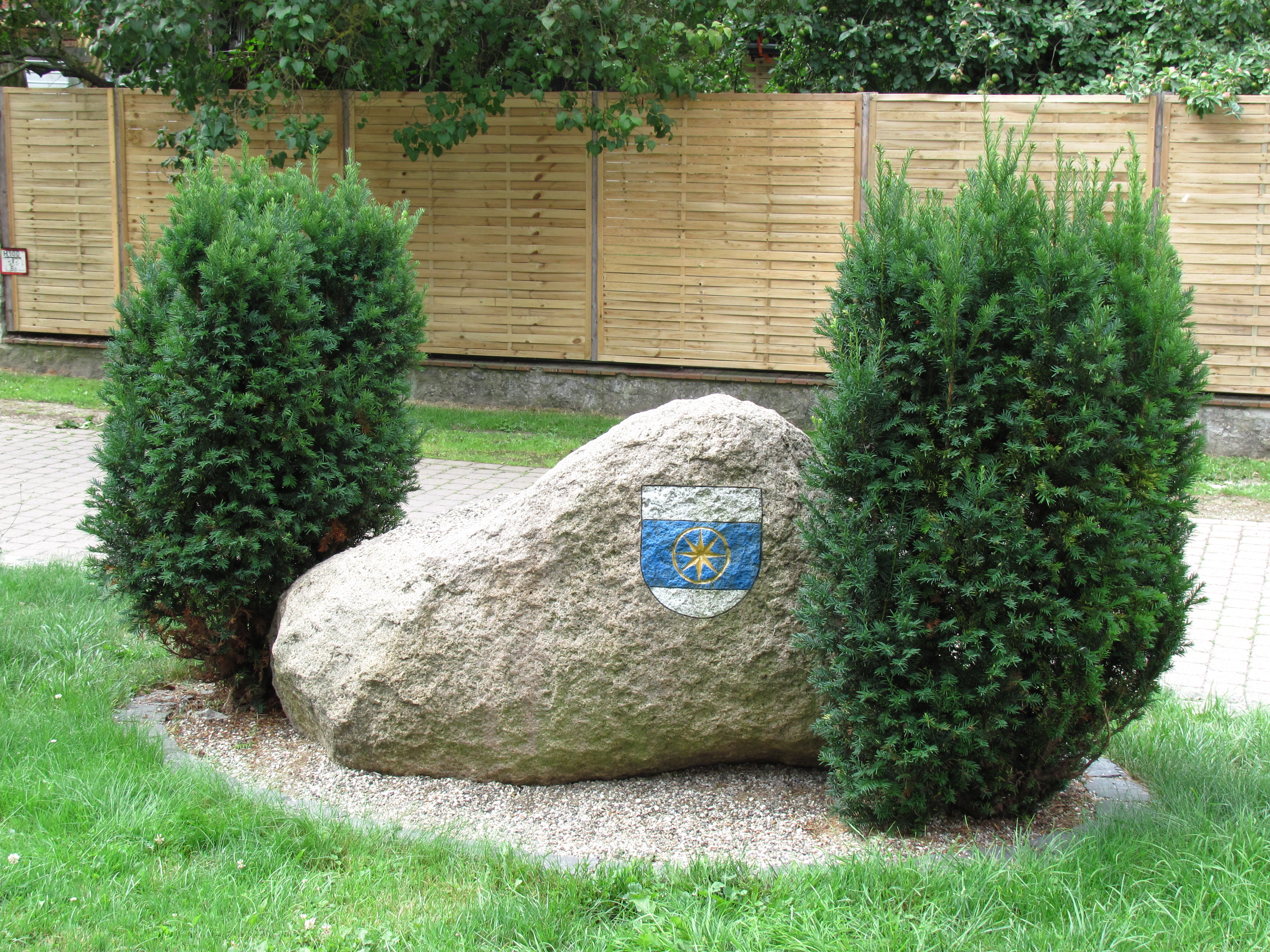
Coat of Arms of Möllensen.

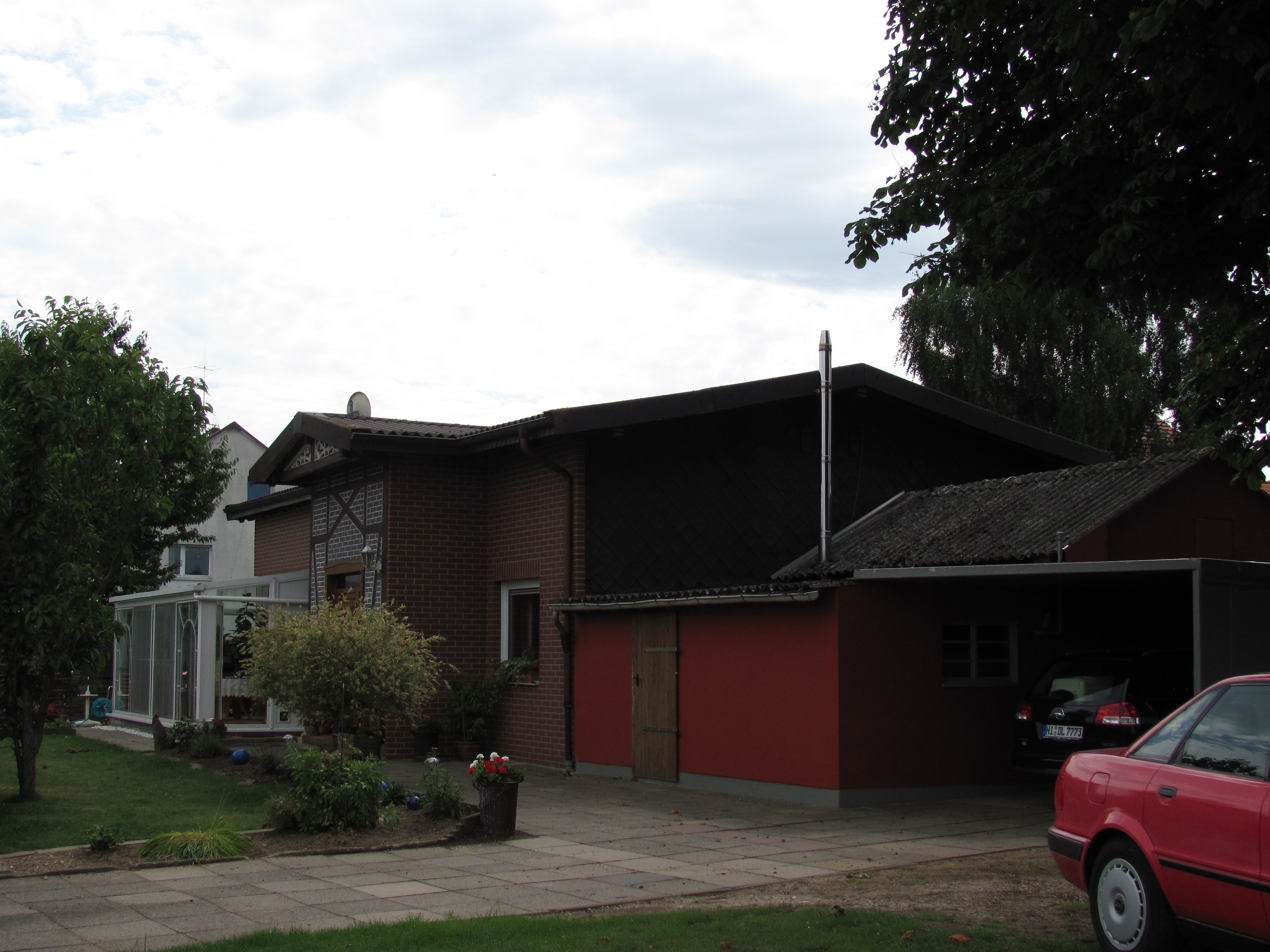
Former Railway Station of Hönze.

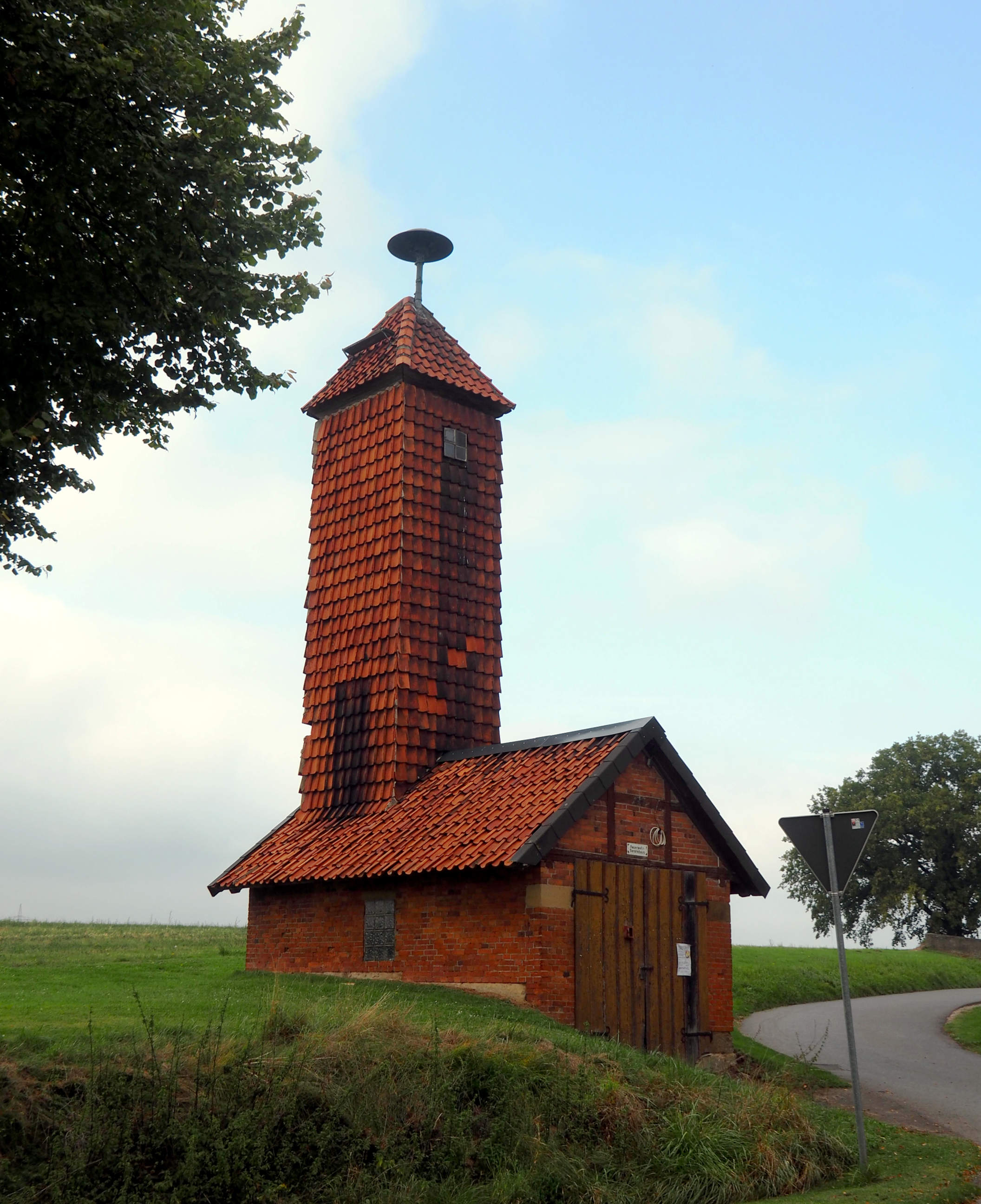
Old fire station of Segeste
