= Adenstedt =

- Ortsteil of Sibbesse
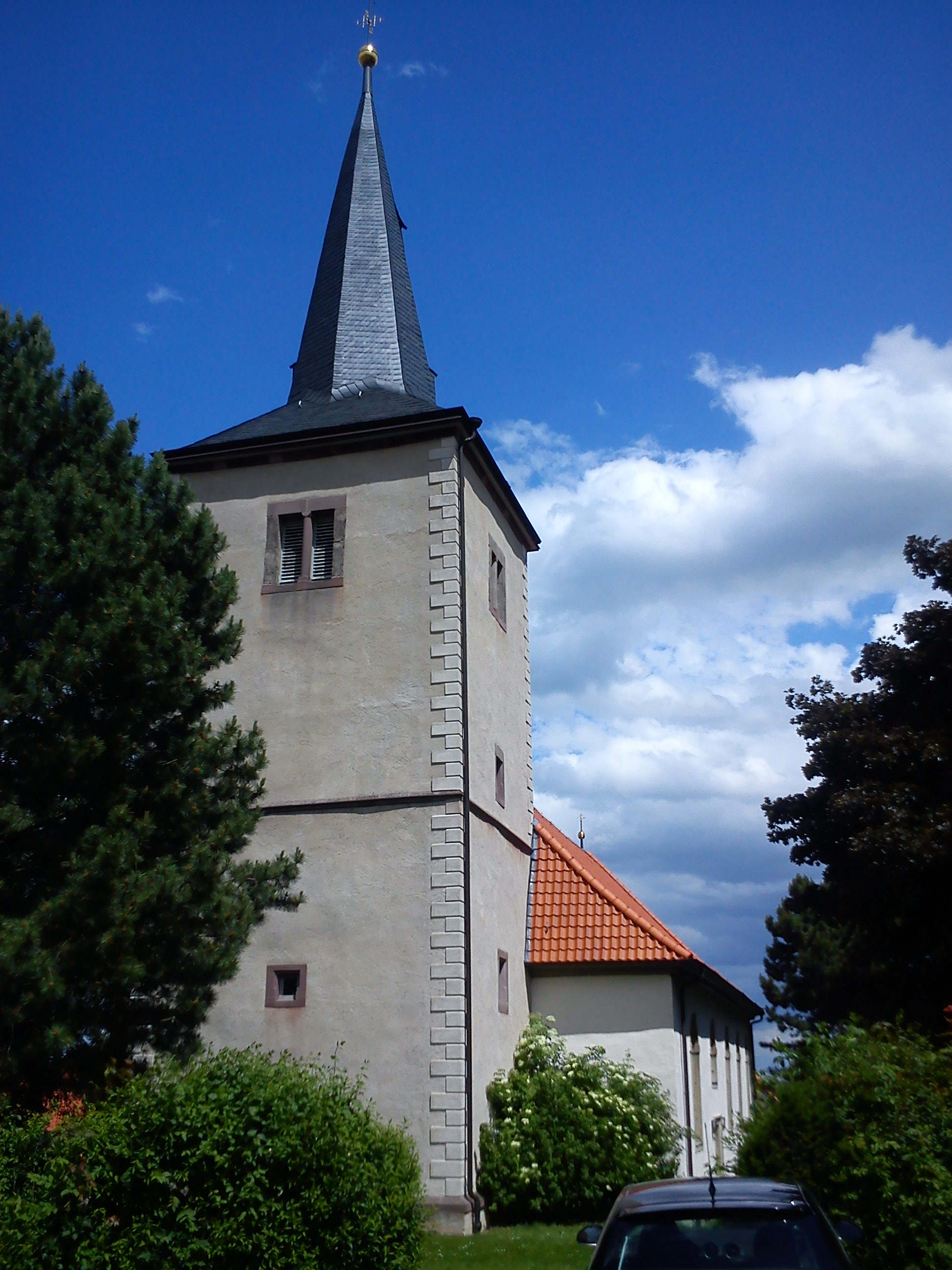
- Church of Adenstedt in 2012

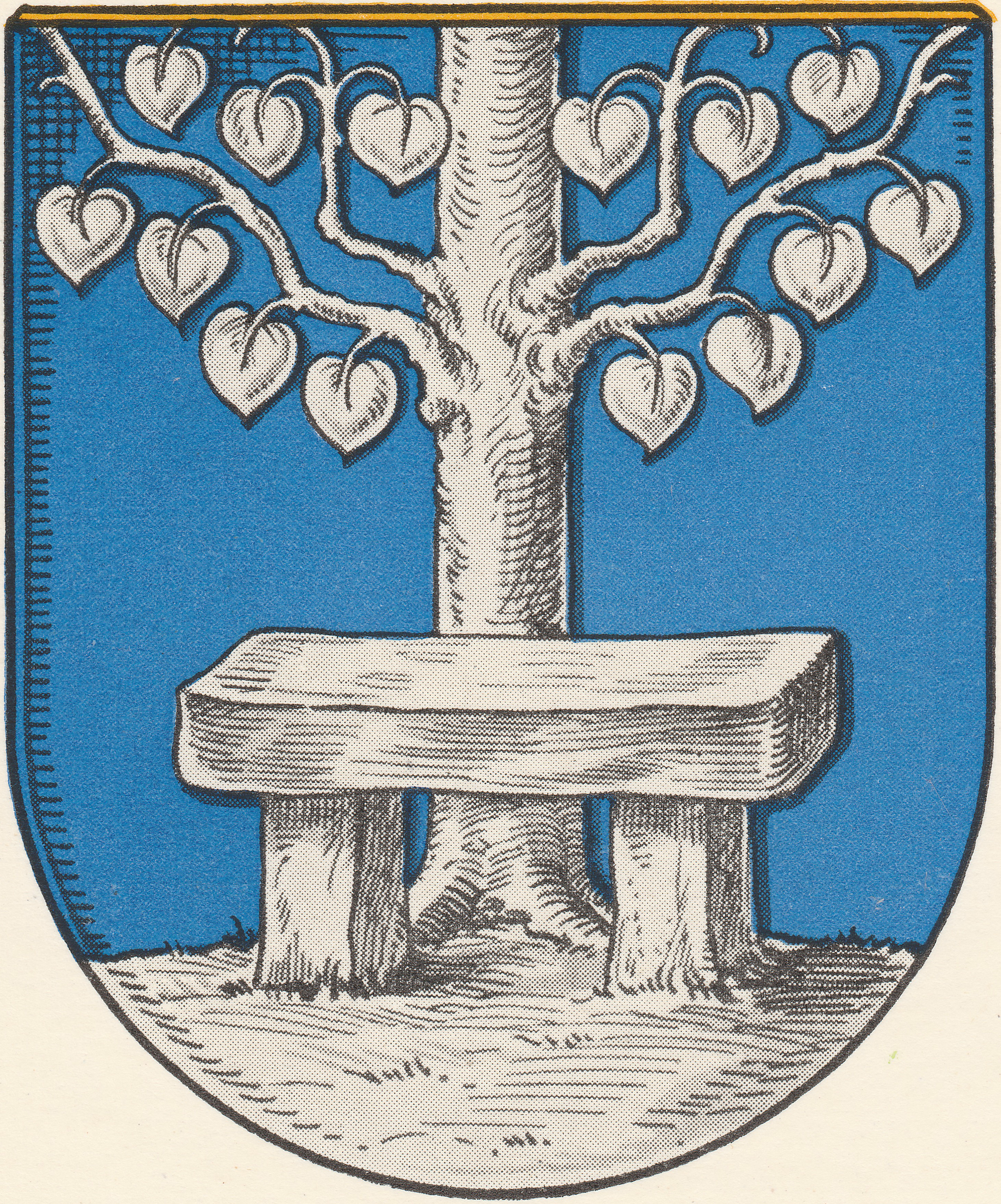
- Coat of arms
- Interactive map of Adenstedt
- Location within Germany Location within Lower Saxony
- Coordinates: 52°00′01″N 9°56′11″E
- Country: Germany
- State: Lower Saxony
- District: Hildesheim
- Municipality: Sibbesse

Area
  - Total: 18.67 km^{2} (7.21 sq mi)
- Elevation: 184 m (604 ft)

Population (2015-12-31)
  - Total: 962
  - Density: 51.5/km^{2} (133/sq mi)
- Time zone: UTC+01:00 (CET)
  - Summer (DST): UTC+02:00 (CEST)
- Postal codes: 31079
- Dialling codes: 05060
- Vehicle registration: HI
- Website: www.samtgemeinde- sibbesse.de

Adenstedt is a village and a former municipality in the district of Hildesheim in Lower Saxony, Germany. Since 1 November 2016 it has been part of the municipality of Sibbesse.

== Sports ==
=== Football ===
- SG Adenstedt (1894/1914)
