= Hildesheim (district) =

District in Lower Saxony, Germany

Coordinates: 52°05′N 9°55′E

- District
- Flag Coat of arms
- Country: Germany
- State: Lower Saxony
- Capital: Hildesheim

Government
  - District admin.: Bernd Lynack (SPD)

Area
  - Total: 1,206 km^{2} (466 sq mi)

Population (31 December 2025)
  - Total: 266,613
  - Density: 221.1/km^{2} (572.6/sq mi)
- Time zone: UTC+01:00 (CET)
  - Summer (DST): UTC+02:00 (CEST)
- Vehicle registration: HI
- Website: www.landkreishildesheim.de

Hildesheim is a district (Landkreis) in Lower Saxony, Germany. It is bounded by (from the north and clockwise) the districts of Hanover, Peine, Wolfenbüttel, Goslar, Northeim, Holzminden and Hameln-Pyrmont.

== History ==
In 1885 the Prussian government established districts within the Province of Hanover. The present territory of the district was occupied by four districts: Hildesheim, Alfeld, Gronau and Marienburg. In 1932 the district of Gronau joined Alfeld, and the number of districts was reduced to three.

When the state of Lower Saxony was founded in 1946, the districts were reorganised: Hildesheim became an urban district, the remaining district of Hildesheim and Marienburg were merged to the new district of Hildesheim-Marienburg. The district of Alfeld remained in its former borders.

In 1974 the city of Hildesheim lost its status as an urban district and became part of the surrounding district, which was renamed to Hildesheim. The districts of Hildesheim and Alfeld were merged in 1977.

== Geography ==
The district is located southeast of Hanover, and the northernmost parts border the Hanover metropolitan area. The northern half of the district is highly urbanised, while the south is covered with forests. The River Leine enters the district in the south, runs through the towns of Alfeld and Gronau and leaves in the northwest towards Hanover; a small affluent, the Innerste, joins the Leine from the east after flowing through the city of Hildesheim. Between Leine and Innerste there are the forested hill chains of the Hildesheim Forest (Hildesheimer Wald) and the Sieben Berge ("Seven Hills", see Alfeld for more details).

== Coat of arms ==
The coat of arms displays:

- the eagle from the arms of the city of Hildesheim
- the deer antler, taken from the former district of Alfeld, represents the Germanic tribe of the Cherusci (cherut="deer")
- the rose stands for Hildesheim's Thousand-year Rose at St. Mary's Cathedral

== Towns and municipalities ==
Clickable map of towns and municipalities in the district

Towns	Free municipalities	Samtgemeinden
1. Alfeld; 2. Bad Salzdetfurth; 3. Bockenem; 4. Elze; 5. Hildesheim; 6. Sarstedt	1. Algermissen; 2. Diekholzen; 3. Freden; 4. Giesen; 5. Harsum; 6. Holle; 7. Lamspringe; 8. Nordstemmen; 9. Schellerten; 10. Sibbesse; 11. Söhlde	1. Leinebergland; 1. Duingen; 2. Eime; 3. Gronau^{1, 2}
^{1}seat of the Samtgemeinde; ^{2}town

== See also ==
- Metropolitan region Hannover-Braunschweig-Göttingen-Wolfsburg
