= Bundesstraße 243 =

Federal highway in Germany

B 243
- Bundesstraße 243

Route information
- Length: 113 km (70 mi)

Major junctions
- Northwest end: Hildesheim
- Southeast end: Nordhausen

Location
- Country: Germany
- States: Lower Saxony, Thuringia

Highway system
- Roads in Germany; Autobahns; List; Federal; List; State; E-roads

The B 243 runs from Hildesheim over Seesen and Herzberg am Harz to Nordhausen.

== Route ==
=== Districts and municipalities ===
- Lower Saxony
  - Hildesheim (district)
    - Hildesheim
    - Diekholzen: Egenstedt
    - Bad Salzdetfurth: Groß Düngen, Wesseln
    - Bockenem: Nette, Bönnien, Bockenem, Bornum
  - Goslar (district)
    - Seesen: Rhüden, Bornhausen, Seesen, Engelade, Münchehof
  - Osterode am Harz (district)
    - Samtgemeinde Bad Grund: Gittelde, Windhausen, Badenhausen
    - Osterode am Harz: Katzenstein, Lasfelde, Petershütte, Osterode, Osterode-Leege
    - Hörden am Harz: Aschenhütte
    - Herzberg am Harz: Herzberg, Scharzfeld
    - Bad Lauterberg im Harz: Barbis, Bartolfelde, Osterhagen
    - Bad Sachsa: Nüxei
- Thuringia
  - Nordhausen (district)
    - Hohenstein: Mackenrode, Holbach
    - Werther: Günzerode

=== Combined routing ===
- From Seesen to AS Engelade combined with the B 248
- Between AS Münchehof and Bad Grund combined with the B 242
- In Osterode between Osterode Mitte and Osterode Süd combined with the B 241
- Between Herzberg and Barbis combined with the B 27

== Rivers crossed ==
- Beuster, near Hildesheim-Marienburg
- Lamme, near Wesseln
- Nette, near Bockenem and Engelade
- Söse, in Osterode
- Sieber, in Herzberg
- Oder, in Barbis – village in borough of Bad Lauterberg
- Steina, in Nüxei – village in borough of Bad Sachsa
- Klettenberger Mühlgraben, near Holbach

== History ==
=== Origins ===
The metalled artificial road (Chaussee) between Seesen and Osterode was built between 1785 and 1795 as an extension of the Frankfurt Road and known as the Thuringian Road (Thüringer Straße).

It was established as Reichsstraße 243 between Hildesheim and Nordhausen in 1937.

This federal road was interrupted by the division of Germany and was only opened again from end to end on 18 November 1989 when the border crossing between Nüxei and Mackenrode was installed.

== Junction lists ==
Legend:

- I/C - Interchange, I/S - Intersection, RSA - Rest and service area, OBR - Overhead bridge restaurant, R/R - Restaurant and rest plaza, L/B - Layby, V/P - Vista point, TN - tunnel, T/P - Toll plaza, BR - Bridge
- C - Cloverleaf, S - Stack, T-A - Trumpet-A, T-B - Trumpet-B, DT - Directional-T/Y, SDT - Semi-Directional-T/Y, P-Y - Partial-Y, D - Diamond, P-C - Partial cloverleaf, D-D - Diverging diamond, D-R - Direct ramp

km	Exit	Name
		Hildesheim B 1
		Groß Düngen
Diversion		Bad Salzdetfurth local diversion
		Bockenem B 243a
		Rhüden B 82
Diversion		Seesen local diversion B 248
		combined with B 248
Motor road		Kraftfahrstraße
		combined with B 248
	(67)	Seesen - with crossroads A 7 E45
End of the motor road		end of motor road
Crossing		Engelade
Crossing		B 64
		Ildehausen B 248
Motor road		Kraftfahrstraße
		Kirchberg
		Münchehof B 242
		combined with B 242
		parking area
		Münchehof-Süd B 242
		Gittelde-Nord
		Ziegenberg parking area
		Gittelde-Süd
		Osterode-Katzenstein
		Osterode-Lasfelde
		Lasfelde parking area
		Osterode-Nord
		Bridge over Osterode 1150 m
		Osterode-Mitte B 241
		combined with B 241
		Osterode-Süd B 241
		Osterode-Leege
		Papenhöhe parking area
		Aschenhütte
		Herzberg am Harz-Nord
End of the motor road		end of motor road
		Herzberg am Harz B 27
		combined with B 27
Motor road		Kraftfahrstraße
		Services Herzberg-Ost
		parking area
		Scharzfeld
		Scharzfeld parking area
		Hasenwinkel Valley Bridge 100 m
		Barbis
		Bad Lauterberg-West (2014) B 27
		Oder Valley Bridge 528 m (2014)
		Bad Lauterberg-Süd (2014)
		Winkel Valley Bridge 650 m (2014)
		Steina (2014)
End of the motor road		end of motor road
		Nüxei
		Mackenrode
		Großwechsungen-Nord
Motor road		Kraftfahrstraße
	(9)	Großwechsungen A 38 (2012)

== See also ==
- List of federal highways in Germany
