= Bad Grund (Samtgemeinde) =

- Samtgemeinde
- Interactive map of Bad Grund
- Location within Germany Location within Lower Saxony
- Coordinates: 51°47′08″N 10°12′40″E
- Country: Germany
- State: Lower Saxony
- District: Osterode
- Disbanded: 1 March 2013
- Subdivisions: 5 municipalities

Area
  - Total: 41.18 km^{2} (15.90 sq mi)
- Elevation: 225 m (738 ft)

Population (2011-12-31)
  - Total: 8,824
  - Density: 214.3/km^{2} (555.0/sq mi)
- Time zone: UTC+01:00 (CET)
  - Summer (DST): UTC+02:00 (CEST)
- Postal codes: 37534, 37539
- Dialling codes: 05327, 05522
- Vehicle registration: OHA
- Website: www.samtgemeinde badgrund.de

Bad Grund (Harz) is a former Samtgemeinde ("collective municipality") in the district of Osterode, in Lower Saxony, Germany. Its seat was in the village Windhausen. It was disbanded on 1 March 2013.

The Samtgemeinde Bad Grund (Harz) consisted of the following municipalities:

- Bad Grund (Harz)
- Badenhausen
- Eisdorf
- Gittelde
- Windhausen
