= Forestry Commission (disambiguation) =

Forestry Commission may refer to:

== Africa ==
- Forestry Commission (Ghana)
- Forestry Commission (Zimbabwe), a forestry university in Mutare
- Central African Forest Commission (French: Commission des Forêts d’Afrique Centrale, or COMIFAC), Yaoundé, Cameroon

== Americas ==
=== United States ===
- Alabama Forestry Commission
- Georgia Forestry Commission
- New Hampshire Forestry Commission; see Kearsarge North
- New York Fisheries, Game and Forest Commission (1895–1900), predecessor to the New York State Department of Environmental Conservation
- New York Forest Commission (1885–1893), predecessor to the New York State Department of Environmental Conservation
- New York Forest, Fish and Game Commission (1900–1911), predecessor to the New York State Department of Environmental Conservation

=== Mexico ===
- National Forestry Commission

== Asia ==
- National Forest Commission (India), established 2003; see Conservation in India

== Australasia ==
- Forestry Commission of Tasmania, Tasmania, Australia; see Richardson v Forestry Commission of Tasmania
- New South Wales Forestry Commission, forest management agency for New South Wales, Australia; see Cumberland State Forest (New South Wales)
- Forests Commission Victoria (1918–1983), Victoria, Australia

== Europe ==
- Forestry Commission, a non-ministerial government department responsible for forestry in England
- Lower Saxon Forestry Commission, Lower Saxony, Germany; see WeltWald Harz

== See also ==
- List of forestry ministries
