= Grund =

Grund or Gründ may refer to:

== Places ==
- Bad Grund, a town in Lower Saxony, Germany
- Bad Grund (Samtgemeinde), a Samtgemeinde in Lower Saxony, Germany
- Grund (Grindelwald), a locality in the municipality of Grindelwald, Bern, Switzerland
- Grund (Hilchenbach), a community in Hilchenbach, North Rhine-Westphalia, Germany
- Grund (Luxembourg), a quarter of the city of Luxembourg, Luxembourg
- Grund (Saanen), a village in the municipality of Saanen, Bern, Switzerland
- Saas-Grund, a town in Valais, Switzerland

== Other uses ==
- Grund (surname)
- Éditions Gründ, French publisher

== See also ==
- Grundt, a surname
- Grunt (disambiguation)
