= Bundesstraße 241 =

Federal highway in Germany

B 241
- Bundesstraße 241

Route information
- Length: 156 km (97 mi)

Major junctions
- West end: Hohenwepel (near Warburg)
- East end: Vienenburg

Location
- Country: Germany
- States: North Rhine-Westphalia, Lower Saxony

Highway system
- Roads in Germany; Autobahns; List; Federal; List; State; E-roads

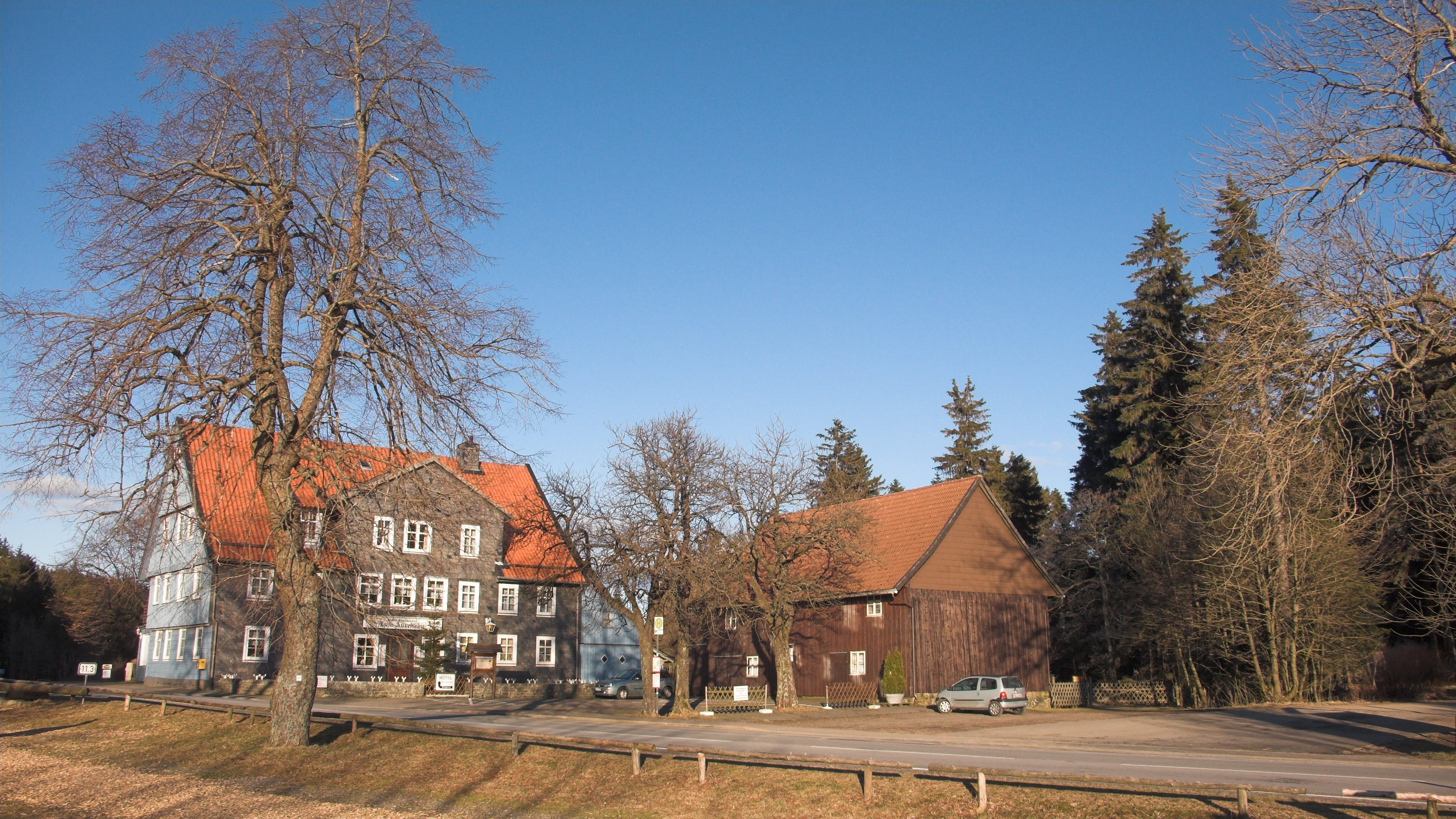
The B 241 reaches its highest point at the Gasthof Auerhahn inn in the Harz mountains (636 m above NHN)

The B 241 is a federal road (Bundesstraße) in Germany.

It runs from Hohenwepel (near Warburg) to Vienenburg.

== Junction lists ==
Legend:

- I/C - Interchange, I/S - Intersection, RSA - Rest and service area, OBR - Overhead bridge restaurant, R/R - Restaurant and rest plaza, L/B - Layby, V/P - Vista point, TN - tunnel, T/P - Toll plaza, BR - Bridge

		Hohenwepel B 252
Diversion		Lütgenerder local diversion
		Borgentreich
		Dalhausen
		Roggenthal
		Beverungen B 83
		Weser
		Weser bridge at Beverungen 65 m
		Lauenförde
		Sollingbahn Ottbergen–Northeim (Han)
		Amelith
		Schönhagen B 497
		Kammerborn
		Sohlingen
		Uslar
		Ahle
		Bollensen
		Gierswalde
		Volpriehausen
		Sollingbahn Ottbergen–Northeim (Han)
		Goseplack
		Hardegsen B 446
		Sollingbahn Ottbergen–Northeim (Han)
		Lutterhausen
		Moringen
	(70)	Northeim-West A 7 E45
		Höckelheim
		Leine
		Northeim B 3 B 248
		Rhume
		Hammenstedt
		Katlenburg B 247
		Dorste
		Rhume
Motor road		Kraftfahrstraße
		Osterode am Harz Mitte B 243
		jointly with the B 243
		Osterode am Harz Süd B 243
End of the motor road		end of motor road
		Osterode B 498
		Söse
Motor road		Kraftfahrstraße
		Tunnel Butterberg Tunnel 393 m
End of the motor road		end of motor road
Diversion		Freiheit local diversion
Diversion		Lerbach local diversion
		parking area
Diversion		Buntenbock local diversion
		Clausthal-Zellerfeld B 242
		parking area
		Goslar B 6 B 82 B 498
		Vienenburg
		Oker
	(12)	Vienenburg A 395

=== States and districts ===
- North Rhine-Westphalia
  - Höxter district
    - Hohenwepel, Borgentreich, Dalhausen, Beverungen
- Lower Saxony
  - Holzminden district
    - Lauenförde
  - Northeim district
    - Amelith, Schönhagen, Kammerborn, Sohlingen, Uslar, Bollensen, Gierswalde, Volpriehausen, Goseplack, Hardegsen, Lutterhausen, Moringen, Höckelheim, Northeim, Hammenstedt, Katlenburg
  - Göttingen district
    - Dorste
    - Osterode
  - Goslar district
    - Clausthal-Zellerfeld, Goslar, Vienenburg, Wiedelah

=== River crossings ===
- Weser, between Beverungen and Lauenförde
- Ahle, in Uslar
- Leine, between Höckelheim und Northeim
- Gose near Goslar
- Rhume, in Northeim and in Katlenburg
- Söse, in Osterode
- Oker, in Oker and Vienenburg

== Tourism ==
- On the section between Lauenförde and Amelith there are two Grabungsstellen as well as the Hutewald Trail (Hutewaldpfad).
- The section between Uslar and Hardegsen was popular with motorcyclists because it ran over the winding and forested mountain road known as the Bollert which also had many straight sections before and after it, but now only parts remain as local roads. The Bollert section of the B241 has now been moved and widened to three lanes between Volpriehausen and Ellierode, improving road capacity and comfort, but making it less attractive to bikers. This work was completed in 2011. The next section, onward from Volpriehausen until Bollensen was opened to traffic in June of 2025.

== See also ==
- List of federal roads in Germany
