= Grunty =

Grunty may refer to:

- A cow-like creature from the .hack series. See Grunties .
- Gruntilda, the main villain of the Banjo-Kazooie series.

== See also ==
- Grunt (disambiguation)
