= WeltWald Harz =

Arboretum in Lower Saxony, Germany

Coordinates: 51.8199°N 10.2286°E

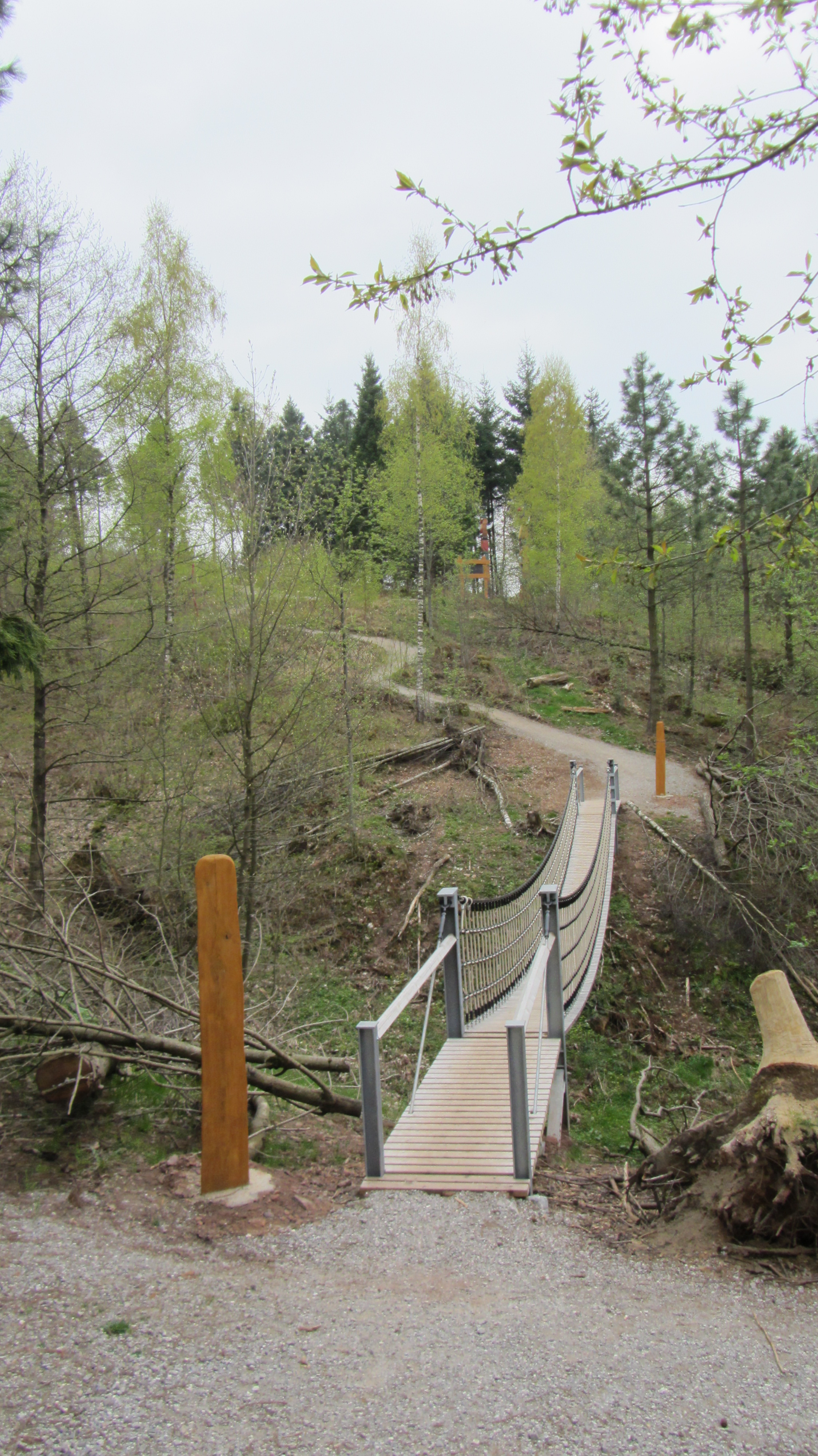
Suspension bridge (nature trail)

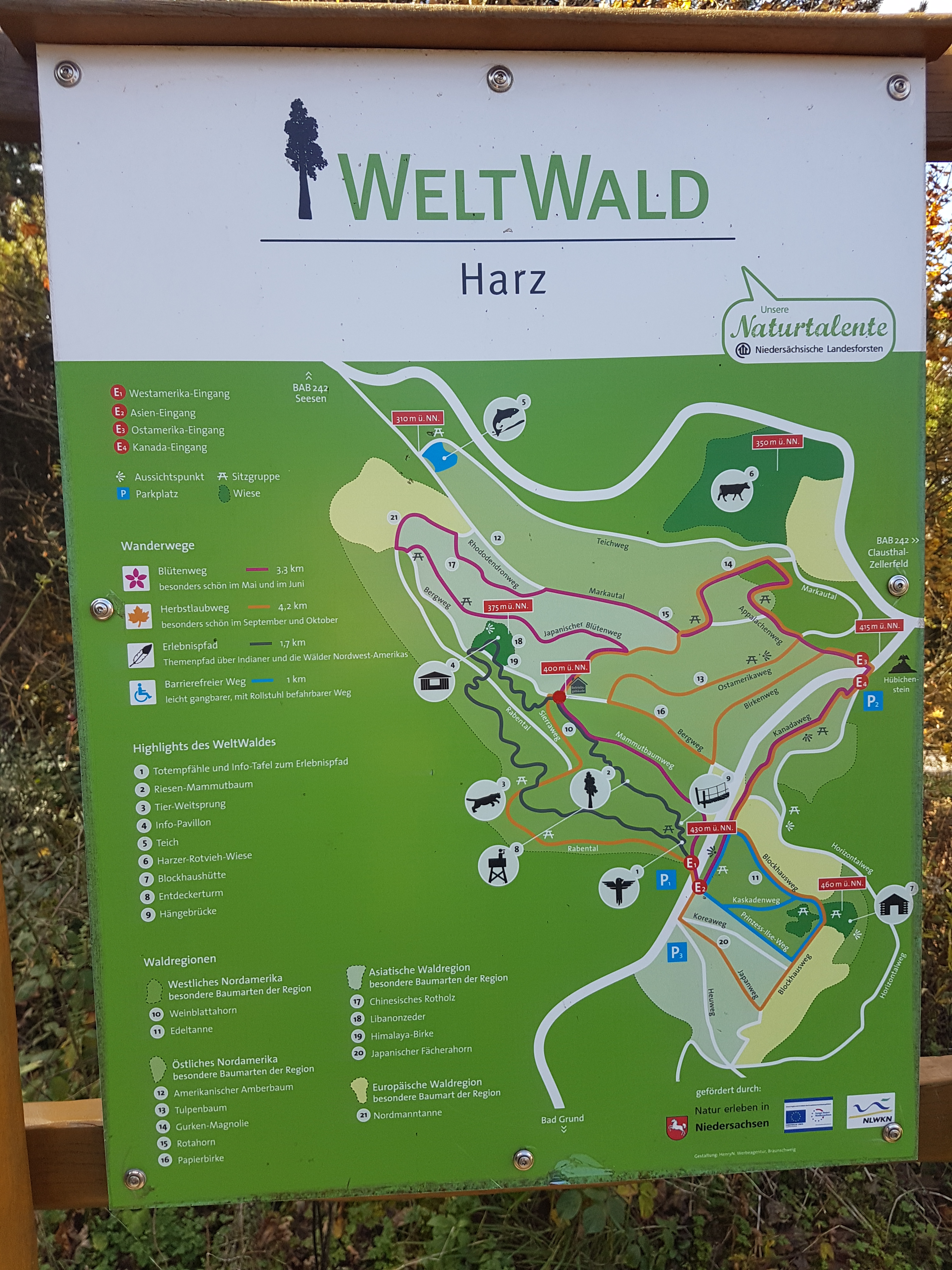
Map

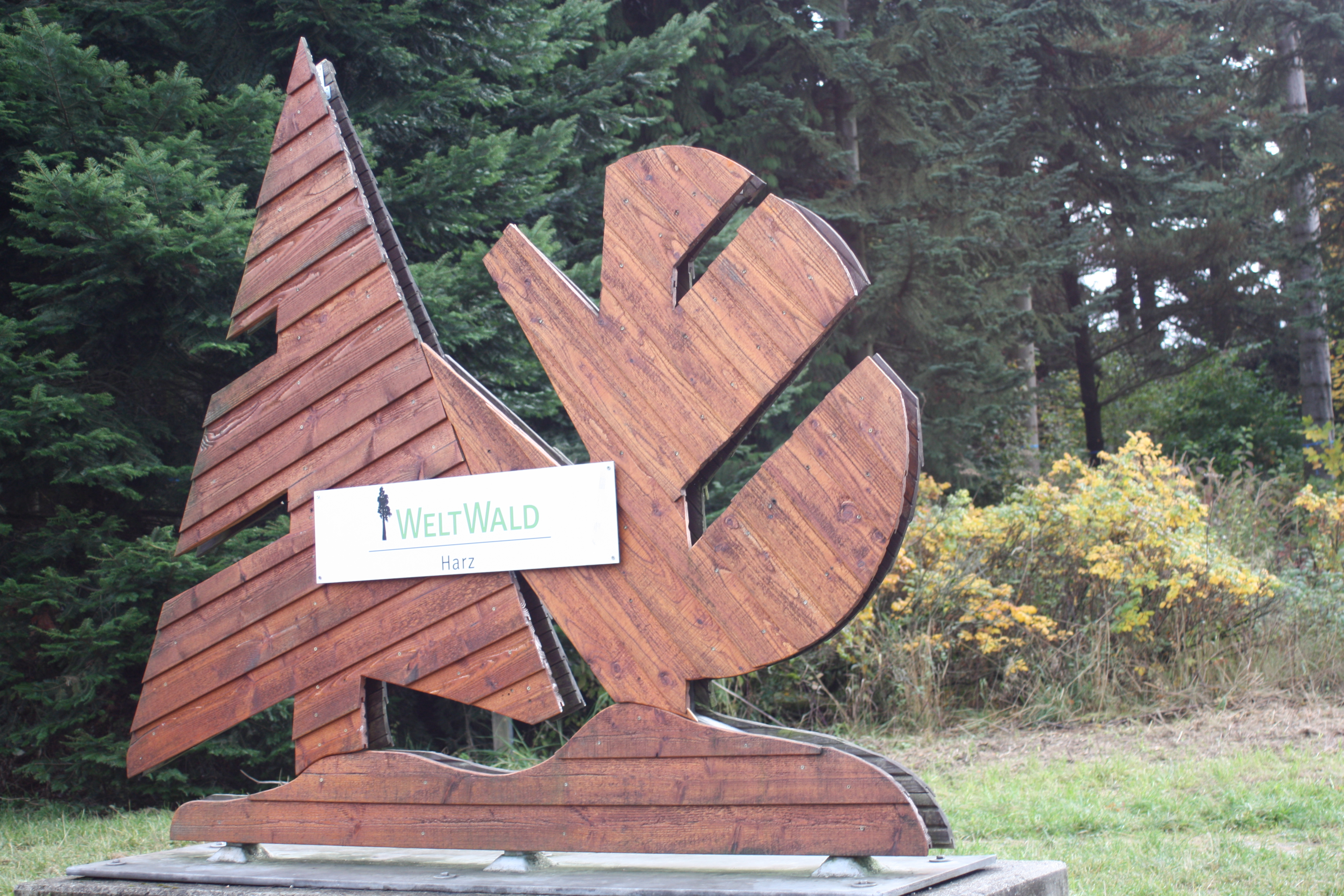
Weltwald Bad Grund

The WeltWald Harz (120 hectares) up to 2009 Arboretum Bad Grund, also known as Exotenwald and sometimes called the Arboretum des Forstamtes Grund or the Forstaboretum der Niedersächsischen Landesforstverwaltung, is an arboretum located along the B 242 federal highway near the Hübichenstein, northwest of Bad Grund, Lower Saxony, Germany. It is open daily without charge.

The arboretum was established in 1971 by the Niedersächsisches Forstamt Riefensbeek (Riefensbeek office of the Lower Saxon Forestry Commission), with first plantings in 1975. By 1987 a total of 84,890 trees and shrubs had been planted on 65 hectares, including fir (30 species), spruce (25), maple (14), birch (10), and oak (8). Today it contains about 600 species of woody plants from Asia, Europe, North America, and Siberia, organized by geographic region, with a number of walking paths.

== Conception ==
The aim of the Lower Saxon Forestry Commission is to study the suitability of the local climate and growing conditions for these non-native tree species. This should enable the habitat requirements of these species to be determined for future crop trials. In laying out the arboretum, especial care was taken to ensure that no unstable monocultural stands were created, instead entire woodland communities from the individual climatic regions with the complete range of tree and shrub species were planted.

To form a clear picture of the development of the trees, they are included in a long-term monitoring and measurement scheme. Their height is determined every five years. Furthermore, various types of biotic and abiotic damage are identified as well as the plant-specific processes during the course of a year. In order to test their suitability as future commercial tree species, trees are constantly removed for timber from the various woodland communities.

== Location ==
The arboretum belongs geologically to the Upper Harz. The southern and western parts are in the Clausthal Culm fault zone (Kulmfaltzone) consisting of greywacke and slate from the Carboniferous period. The northeastern part is in the territory of the Corallian limestone block of the Iberg complex. The soils that have developed from the geological source materials, are mainly base-poor, silty and loamy silicate-weathered soils. The water balance ranges from moderate to fairly fresh and the nutrient supply from moderate to fairly good.

The arboretum lies in the transition zone from the submontane to montane zones, its elevation ranging from 305 to 448 metres above sea level. Its natural woodland communities would be wood-rush beech forests. The terrain aspect ranges from 0 to 30 degrees. The average temperature is 7.5 °C and the average annual precipitation is 1,070 mm. Of that, 308 mm falls during the main growing season.

== Events ==
In addition to diverse woodland communities, the Bad Grund Arboretum offers visitors various special exhibitions. During Advent, foliage and Christmas trees from the region are sold here.

Twice a year an international Nordic Walking race takes place in the grounds of the Arboretum. The details of this are available from the Lower Saxon Forestry Commission Office (Niedersächsische Forstamt) at Riefensbeek. The office is also responsible for the organisation of guided tours, for example during the period of Indian Summer in autumn or during the rhododendron flowering season in spring.

== Hiking ==
There is also a checkpoint (no. 129) for the Harzer Wandernadel hiking network in the arboretum.

== See also ==
- List of botanical gardens in Germany

== Sources ==
- Heinke Ramisch, "Das Arboretum des Forstamtes Grund", Unser Harz 35 (9) : 163–167, Clausthal-Zellerfeld, 1987.
