= Grunt =

Grunt, grunts or grunting may refer to:

== Sound and music ==
- Grunting (tennis), in tennis refers to the loud noise, sometimes described as "shrieking" or "screaming", made by some players during their strokes
- Death grunt, the death metal singing style
- Grunt Records, a vanity label founded in 1971 by Jefferson Airplane and distributed by RCA Records
- "The Grunt", a 1970 instrumental recording by The J.B.'s

== Food and animals ==
- A jug of 32 ounces of liquid, half a growler (usually beer)
- A food preparation similar to a cobbler
- A family of fishes, also known as Haemulidae
- Grunt-fish, the only member of the fish family Rhamphocottidae

== Technology ==
- Grunt (software), a JavaScript Task Runner
- Fobos-Grunt, a failed Russian mission to Phobos, one of the moons of Mars

== Military ==
- An infantryman, in American military slang
- Grunt (G.I. Joe), a fictional character in the G.I. Joe universe

== Games ==
- Grunt (board wargame), a 1971 tactical wargame
- Gruntz, a 1999 puzzle/strategy game
- Grunt (Halo), an alien in the game Halo
- Grunt (Mass Effect), Krogan squadmate in Mass Effect 2
- A low ranking soldier in the IMC and Militia found in the campaign and the multiplayer Titanfall 2

== Fiction ==
- Grunts!, a 1992 fantasy novel by Mary Gentle
- Grunt!, a 1983 Italian film featured in the movie Troll 2
- The Brothers Grunt, an MTV animated series

== Other uses ==
- Michał Grunt (born 1993), Polish professional footballer
- Grunt (horse)

== See also ==
- Grund (disambiguation)
- Grundt, a surname
- Grunty (disambiguation)
