= Eisdorf =

- Ortsteil of Bad Grund
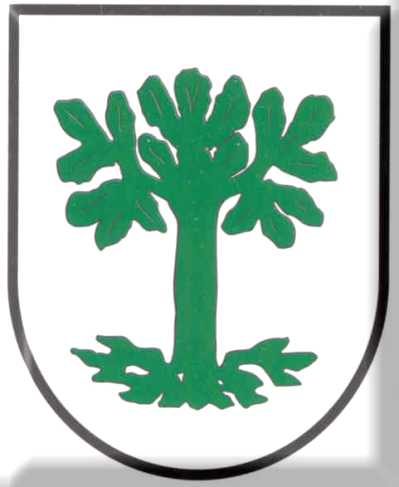
- Coat of arms
- Interactive map of Eisdorf
- Location within Germany Location within Lower Saxony
- Coordinates: 51°45′45″N 10°10′45″E
- Country: Germany
- State: Lower Saxony
- District: Göttingen
- Municipality: Bad Grund

Area
  - Total: 10.56 km^{2} (4.08 sq mi)
- Elevation: 161 m (528 ft)

Population (2011-12-31)
  - Total: 1,400
  - Density: 130/km^{2} (340/sq mi)
- Time zone: UTC+01:00 (CET)
  - Summer (DST): UTC+02:00 (CEST)
- Postal codes: 37534
- Dialling codes: 05522
- Vehicle registration: OHA
- Website: www.eisdorf.de

Eisdorf (German pronunciation: [ˈaɪsdɔʁf]) is a village and a former municipality in the district of Göttingen, in Lower Saxony, Germany. Since 1 March 2013, it is part of the municipality Bad Grund.
