= Grundt =

Grundt is a surname. Notable people with the surname include:

- Arne Ludvig Grundt Ileby (1913–1999), Norwegian footballer
- Julian Grundt (born 1988), German footballer
- Ken Grundt (born 1969), American baseball pitcher
- Lars Otto Roll Grundt (1843–1907), Norwegian civil servant and politician
- Michael Grundt Spang (1931–2003), Norwegian journalist, crime reporter and crime fiction writer

== See also ==
- Grund (disambiguation)
- Grunt (disambiguation)
