= Diekholzen =

- Municipality
- Coat of arms

- Location of Diekholzen within Hildesheim district
- Interactive map of Diekholzen
- Location within Germany Location within Lower Saxony
- Coordinates: 52°06′N 09°56′E
- Country: Germany
- State: Lower Saxony
- District: Hildesheim

Government
  - Mayor (2021–26): Matthias Bludau (SPD)

Area
  - Total: 30.21 km^{2} (11.66 sq mi)

Population (2025-12-31)
  - Total: 5,948
  - Density: 196.9/km^{2} (509.9/sq mi)
- Time zone: UTC+01:00 (CET)
  - Summer (DST): UTC+02:00 (CEST)
- Postal codes: 31199
- Dialling codes: 05121 and 05064
- Vehicle registration: HI
- Website: www.diekholzen.de

Diekholzen is a village and a municipality in the district of Hildesheim, in Lower Saxony, Germany. It is situated approximately 6 km southwest of Hildesheim on the Beuster, a tributary of the Innerste.

== History ==
In 1974, the former villages of Diekholzen, Söhre, Barienrode and Egenstedt were united to form the municipality of Diekholzen. Each village has its own history and various sights. Most of the inhabitants are Roman Catholics. The largest village of the municipality is Diekholzen with an administration building, a school, a hospital, several shops, a supermarket, some restaurants and a hotel. Several times a day, each village of the municipality is accessible from Hildesheim and from Alfeld by bus.

== Personalities ==
- Johann Friedrich Ruthe (1788-1859), lecturer, botanist and entomologist; born in the district of Egenstedt
- Karl Hoppe (1923-1987), motorcycle racing driver

== Gallery ==
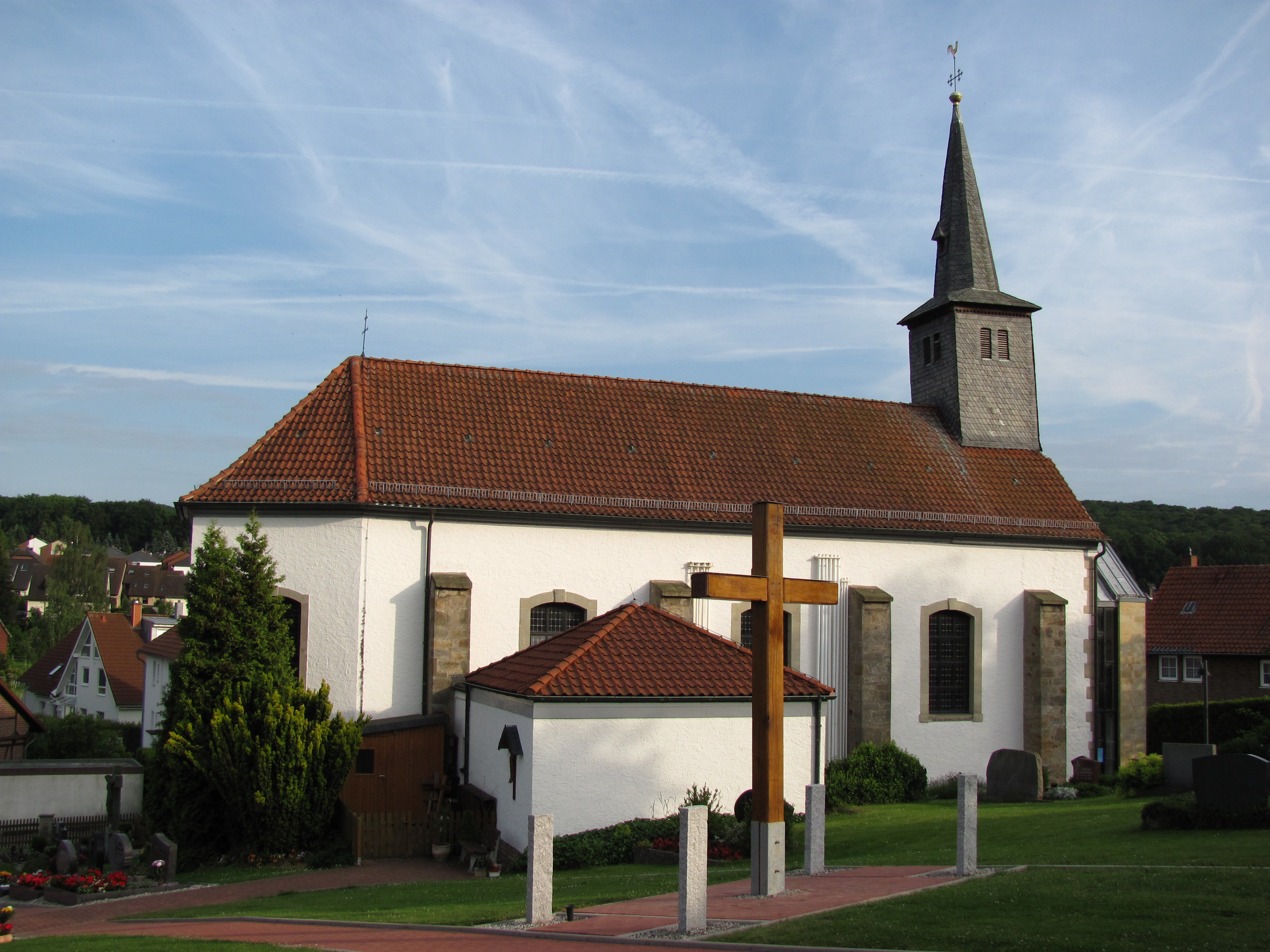
Saint Jakobus Church (1656), Diekholzen

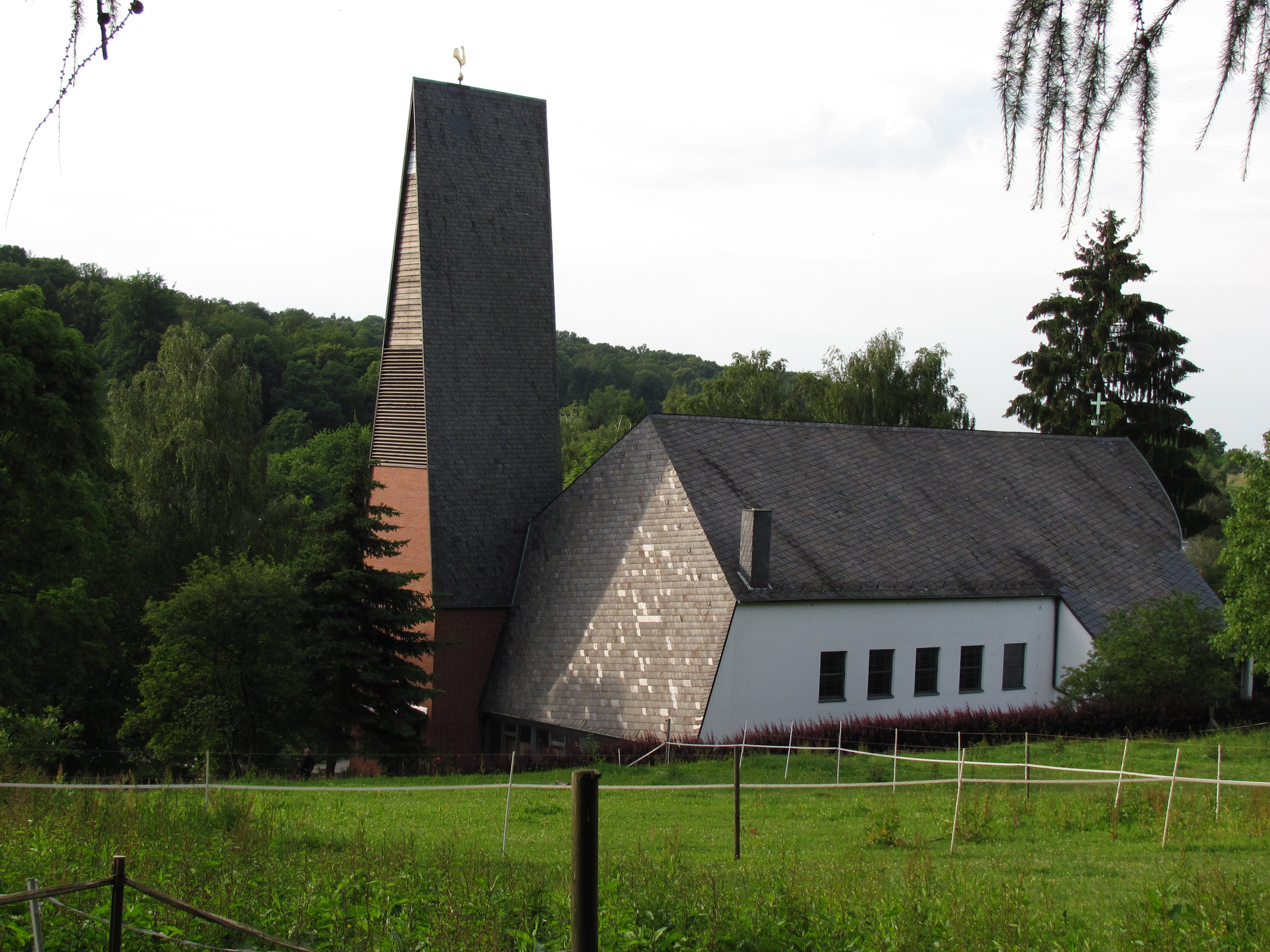
Protestant Church (1963), Diekholzen

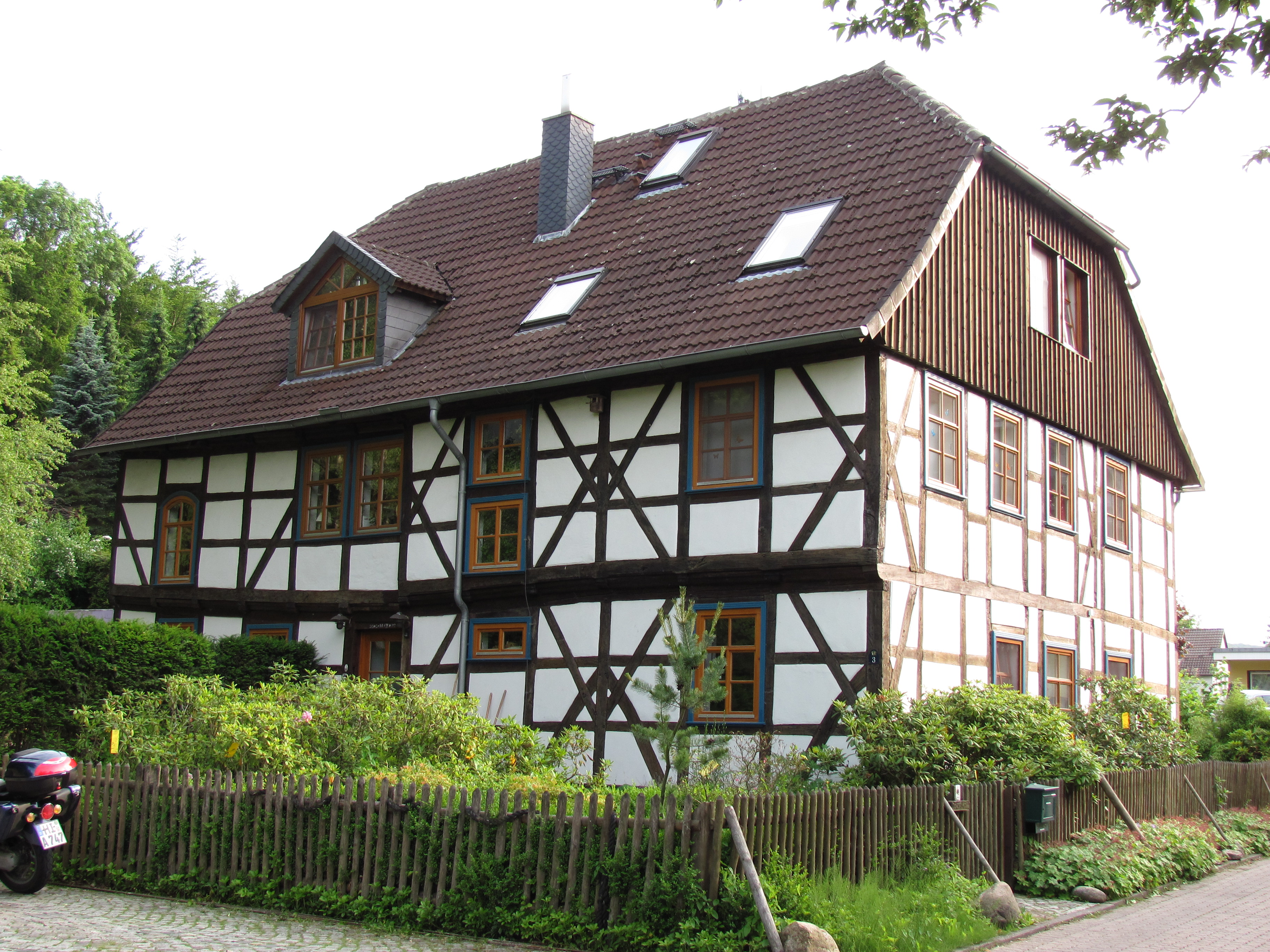
Half-timbered house, Diekholzen

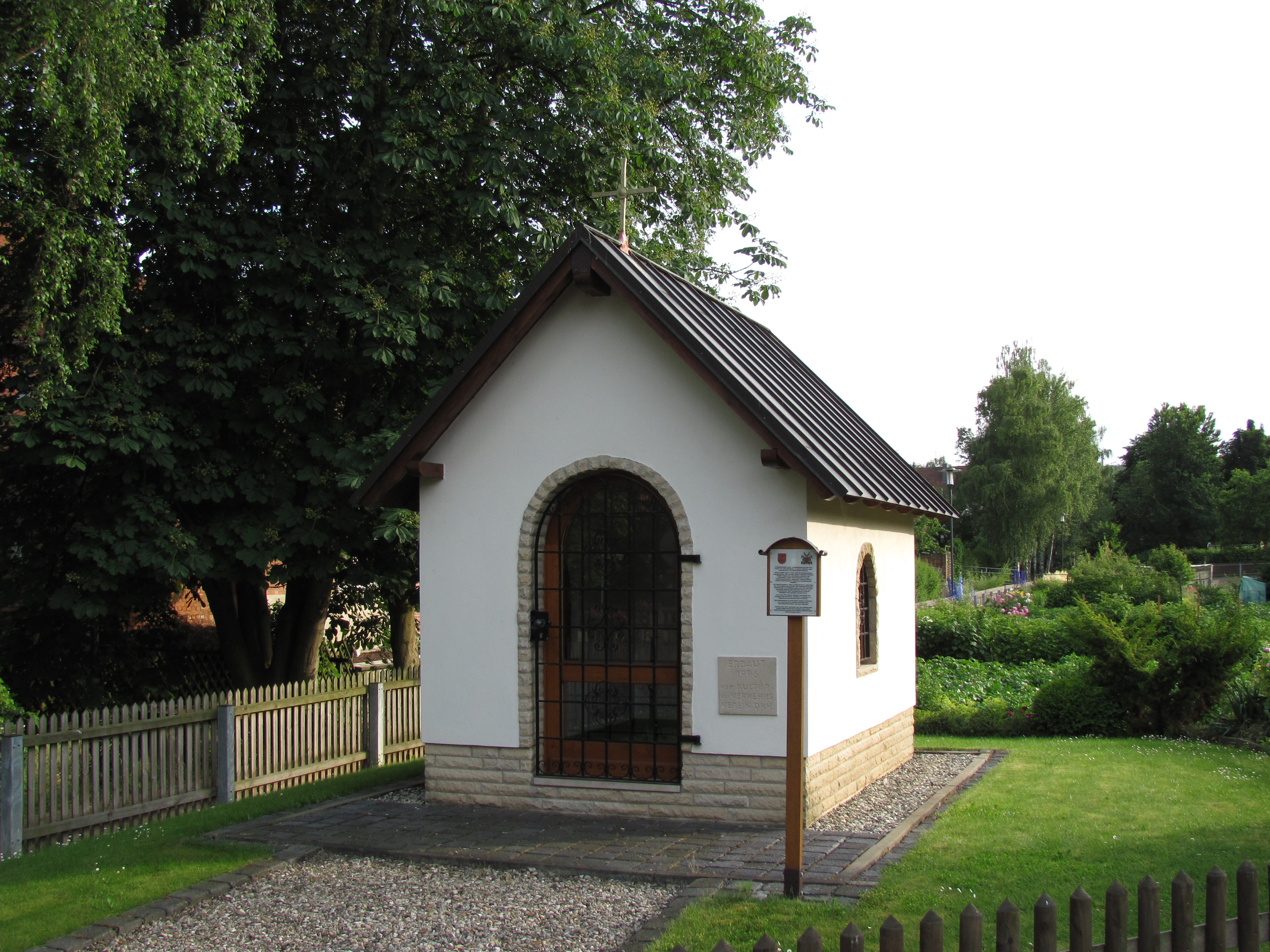
Chapel (1996) on the river Beuster, Diekholzen

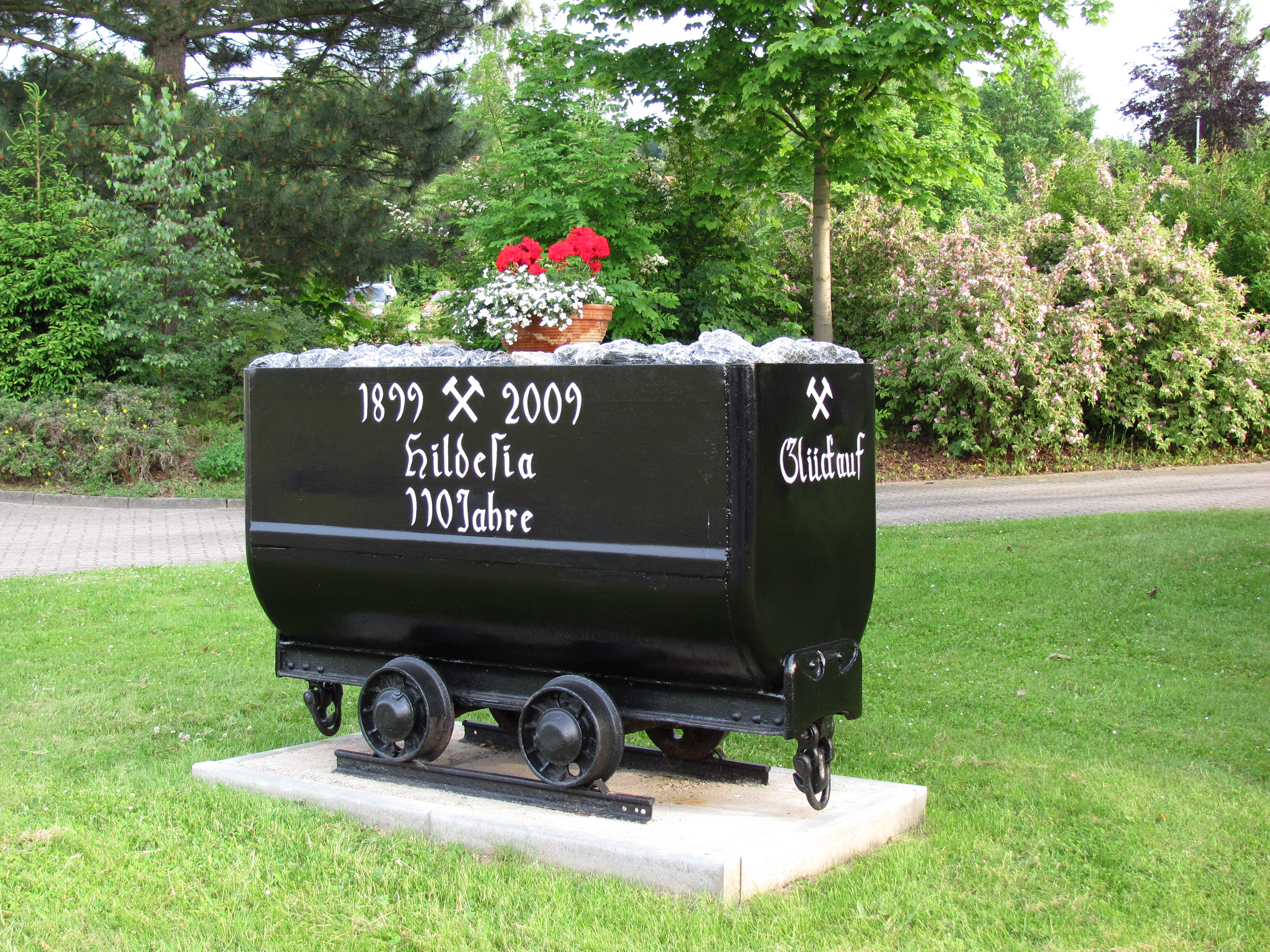
Miners' Memorial, Diekholzen

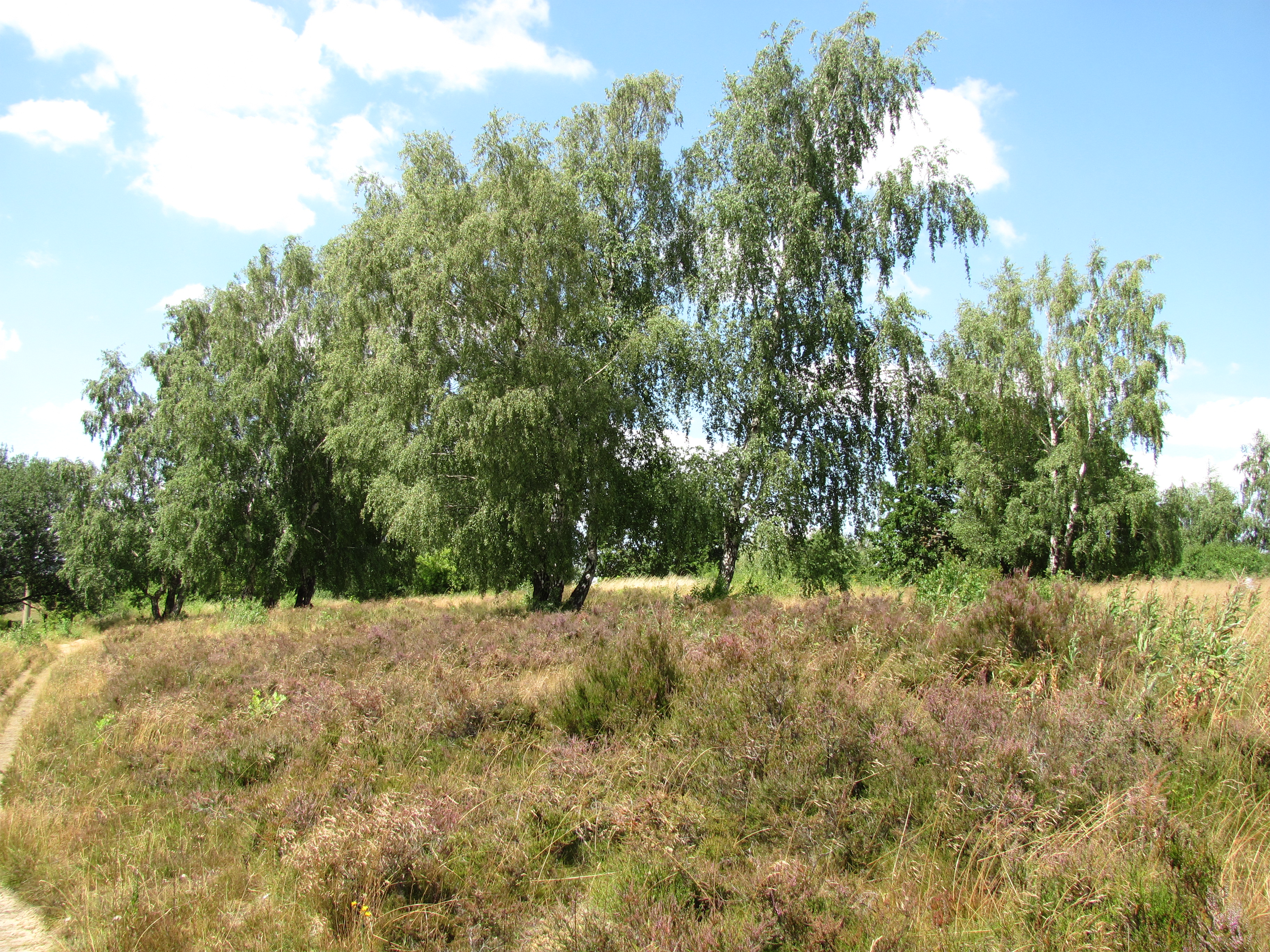
Nature reserve, Söhre

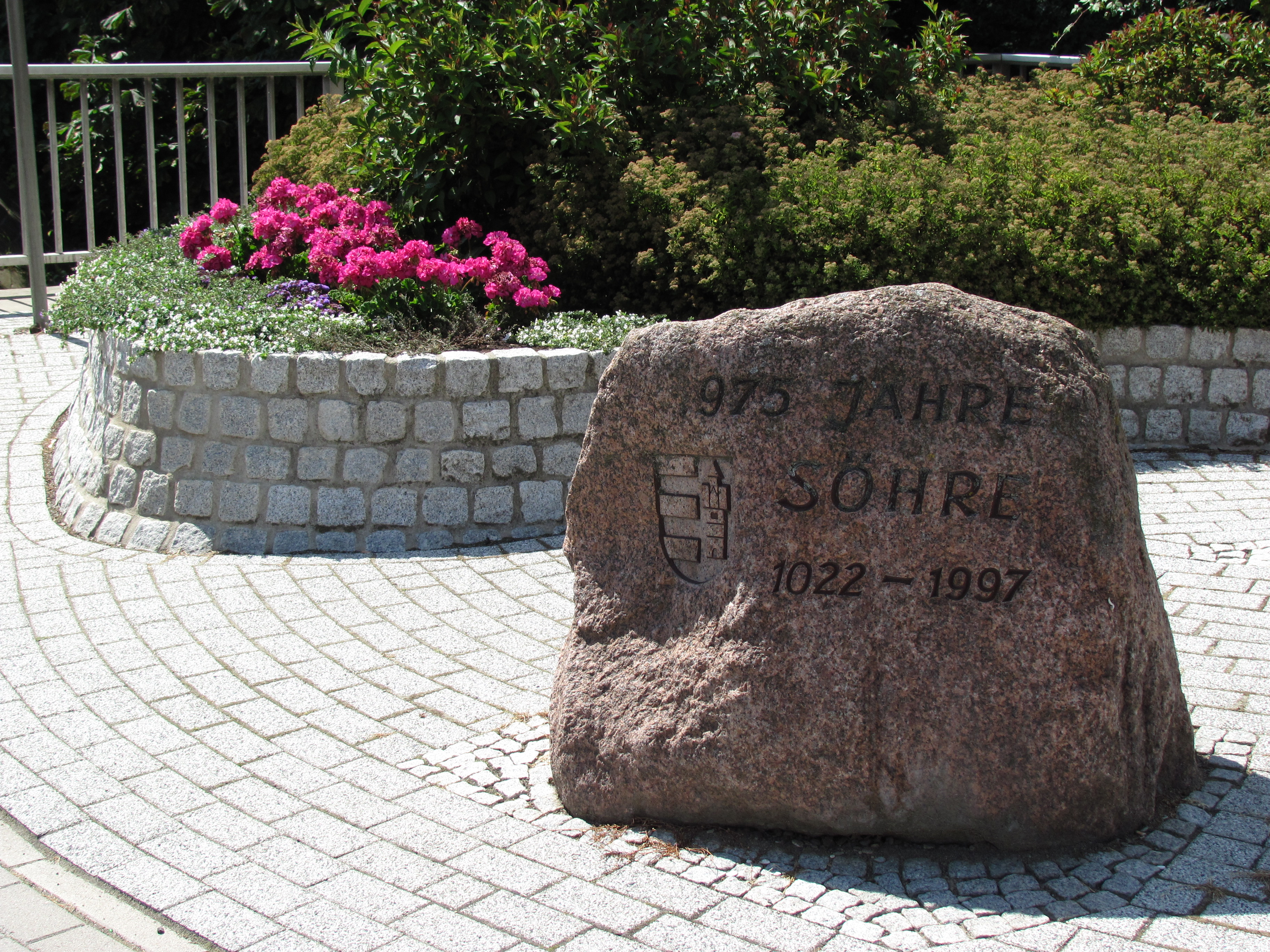
Memorial stone, Söhre

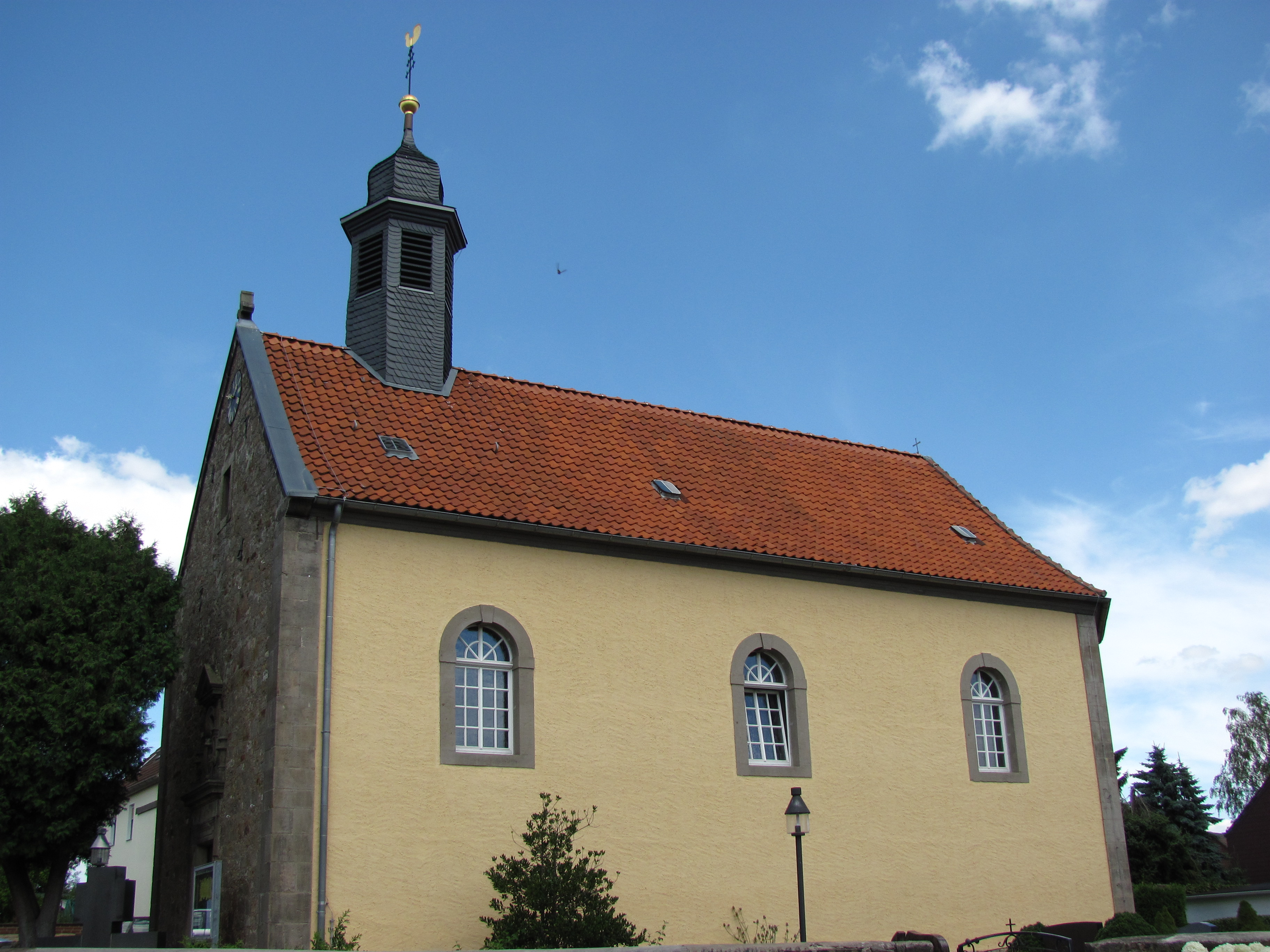
Saint Nicholas Church (1734), Barienrode

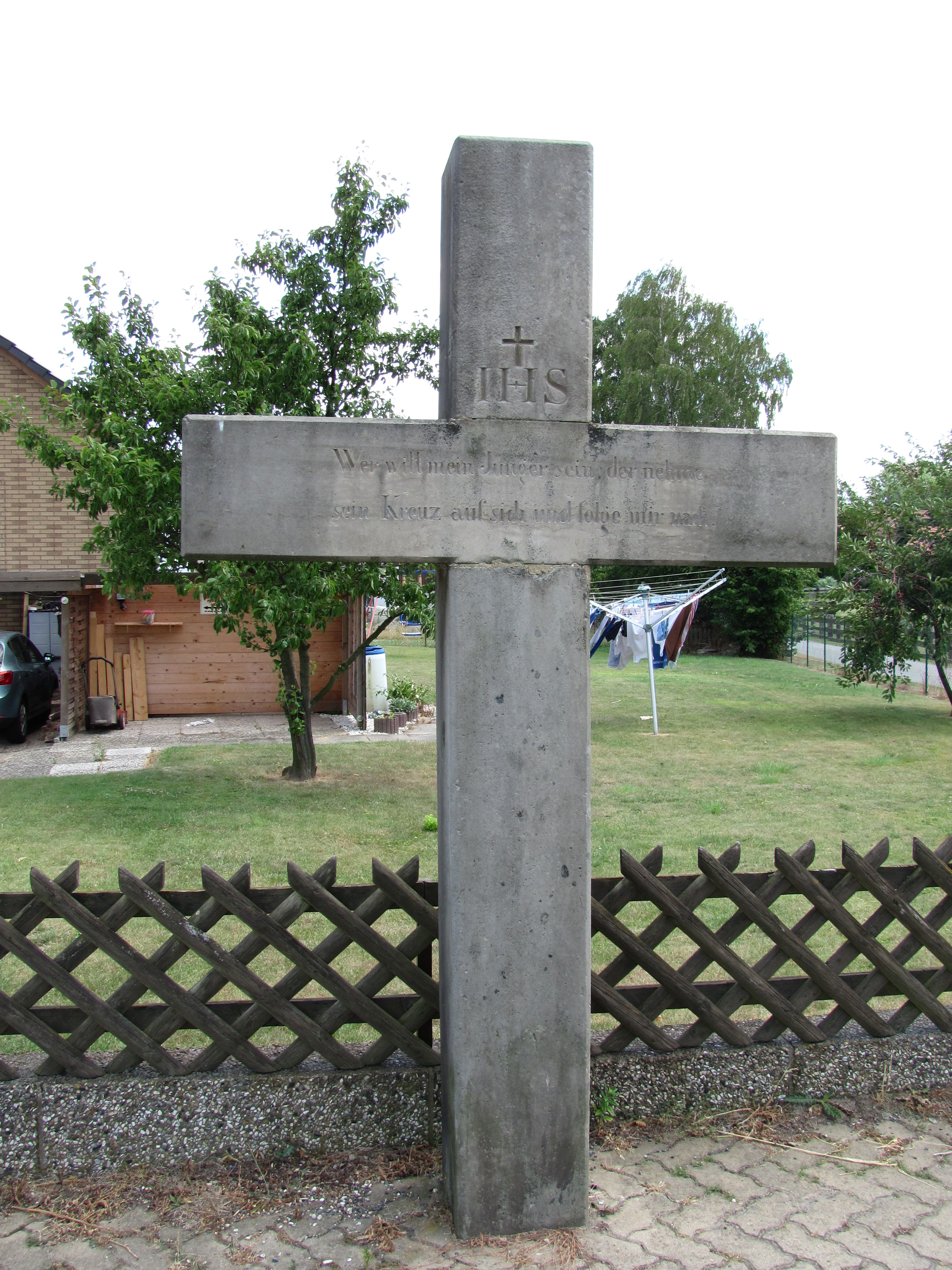
Stone cross (1860), Barienrode
