= Badenhausen =

- Ortsteil of Bad Grund
- Coat of arms
- Interactive map of Badenhausen
- Location within Germany Location within Lower Saxony
- Coordinates: 51°46′20″N 10°12′35″E
- Country: Germany
- State: Lower Saxony
- District: Göttingen
- Municipality: Bad Grund
- Subdivisions: 2 Ortsteile

Area
  - Total: 7.41 km^{2} (2.86 sq mi)
- Elevation: 175 m (574 ft)

Population (2011-12-31)
  - Total: 1,886
  - Density: 255/km^{2} (659/sq mi)
- Time zone: UTC+01:00 (CET)
  - Summer (DST): UTC+02:00 (CEST)
- Postal codes: 37534
- Dialling codes: 05522
- Vehicle registration: OHA

Badenhausen (German pronunciation: [baːdn̩ˈhaʊzn̩]) is a village and a former municipality in the district of Göttingen, in Lower Saxony, Germany. Since 1 March 2013, it is part of the municipality Bad Grund.
