= Hübichenstein =

Coordinates: 51.82°N 10.235°E

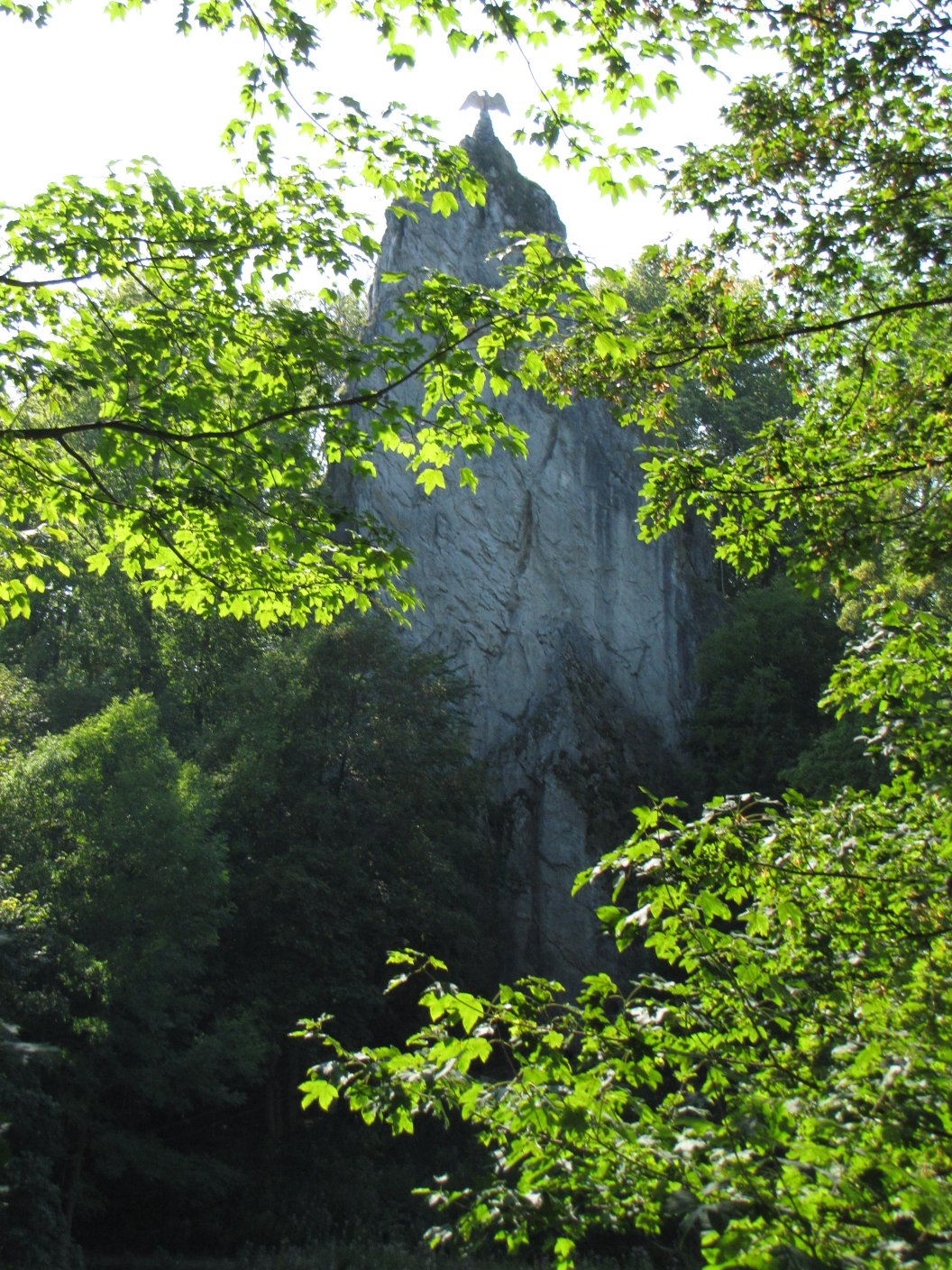

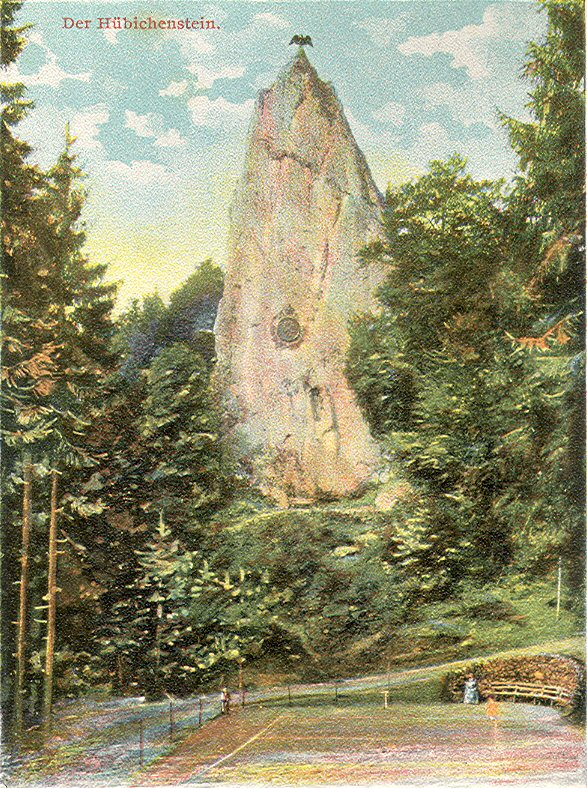
The Hübichenstein

The Hübichenstein is an unusual rock formation in the Harz mountains, 50 meters in height, located on highway B242 about one kilometer northwest of Bad Grund, Lower Saxony, Germany. In 1897 it was crowned with a monument to Kaiser Wilhelm I, in the shape of an eagle with three-meter wingspan.
