= Windhausen =

- Ortsteil of Bad Grund
- Coat of arms
- Interactive map of Windhausen
- Location within Germany Location within Lower Saxony
- Coordinates: 51°47′12″N 10°12′47″E
- Country: Germany
- State: Lower Saxony
- District: Göttingen
- Municipality: Bad Grund

Area
  - Total: 3.54 km^{2} (1.37 sq mi)
- Elevation: 225 m (738 ft)

Population (2011-12-31)
  - Total: 1,003
  - Density: 283/km^{2} (734/sq mi)
- Time zone: UTC+01:00 (CET)
  - Summer (DST): UTC+02:00 (CEST)
- Postal codes: 37539
- Dialling codes: 05327
- Vehicle registration: OHA

Windhausen (German pronunciation: [vɪntˈhauzn̩]) is a village and a former municipality in the district of Göttingen, in Lower Saxony, Germany. Since 1 March 2013, it is part of the municipality Bad Grund.

== Sights ==
Protestant St. John's Church in the centre of Windhausen is a half-timbered building with a flèche covered with slate. There are many well-preserved half-timbered houses in the middle of the village. Close to the village, the ruins of Windhausen Castle (Burg Windhausen) are clearly visible.

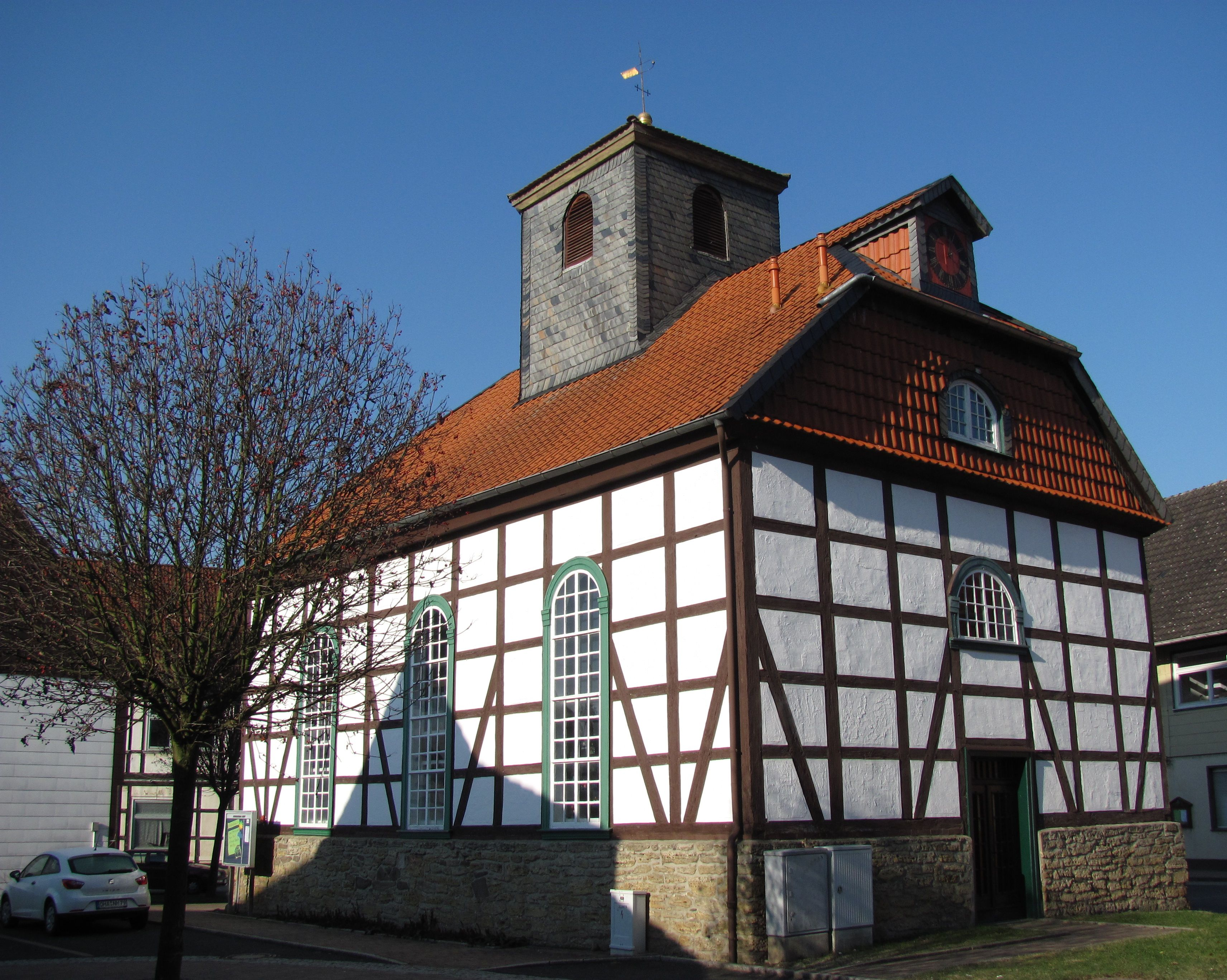
Protestant Church

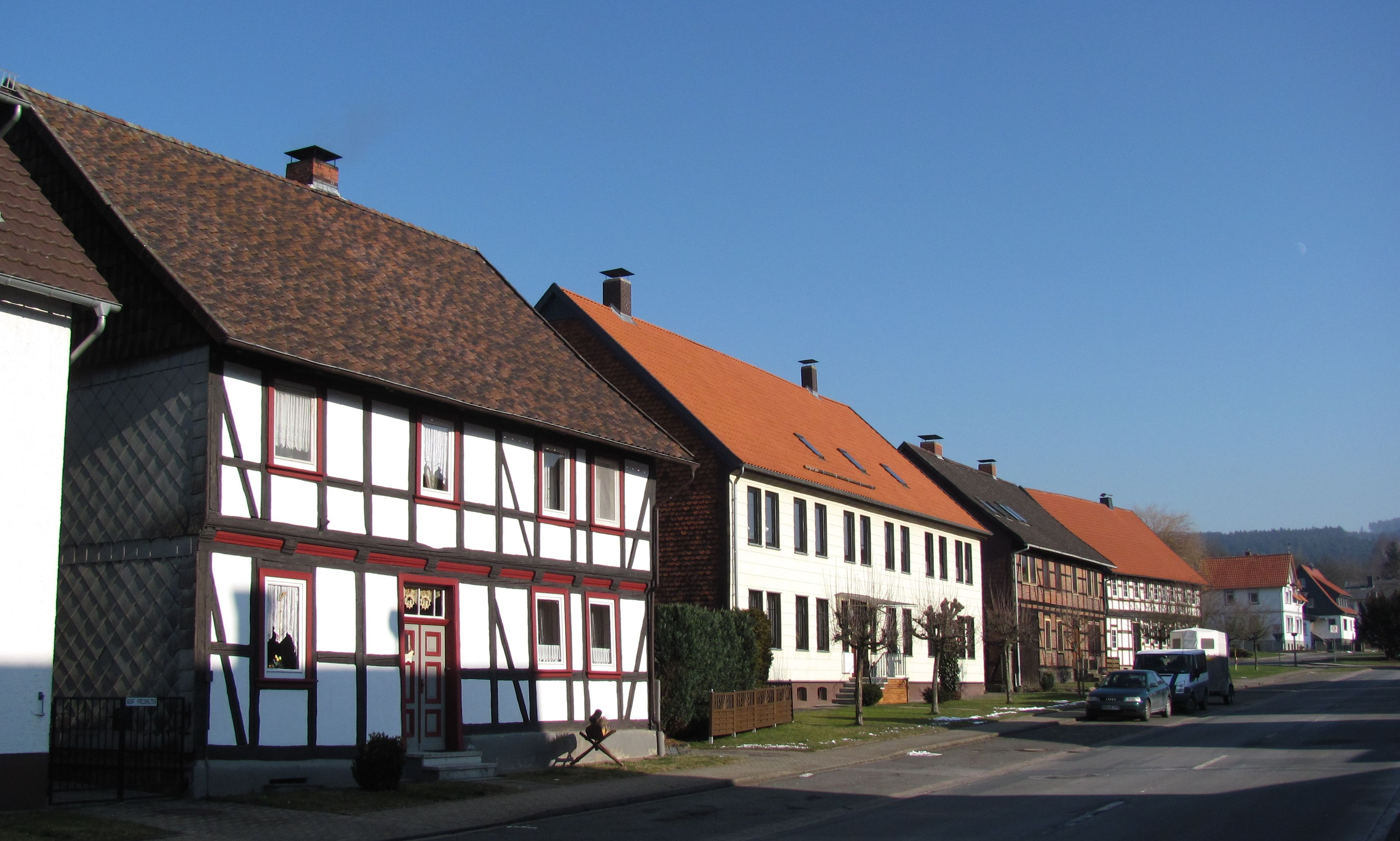
Half-timbered houses, Obere Harzstraße

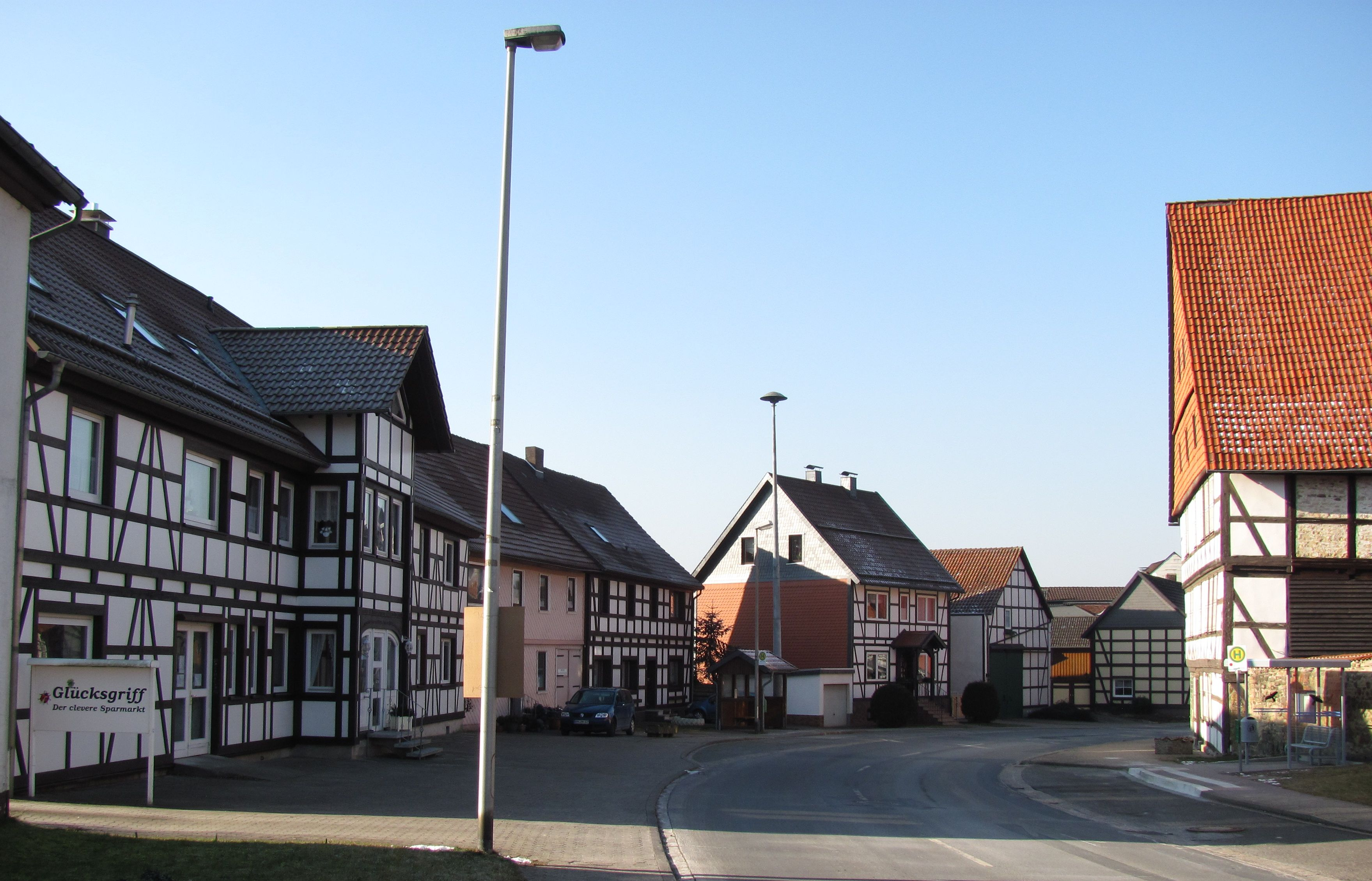
Half-timbered houses, Obere Harzstraße
