= Ahle (Schwülme) =

River in Germany

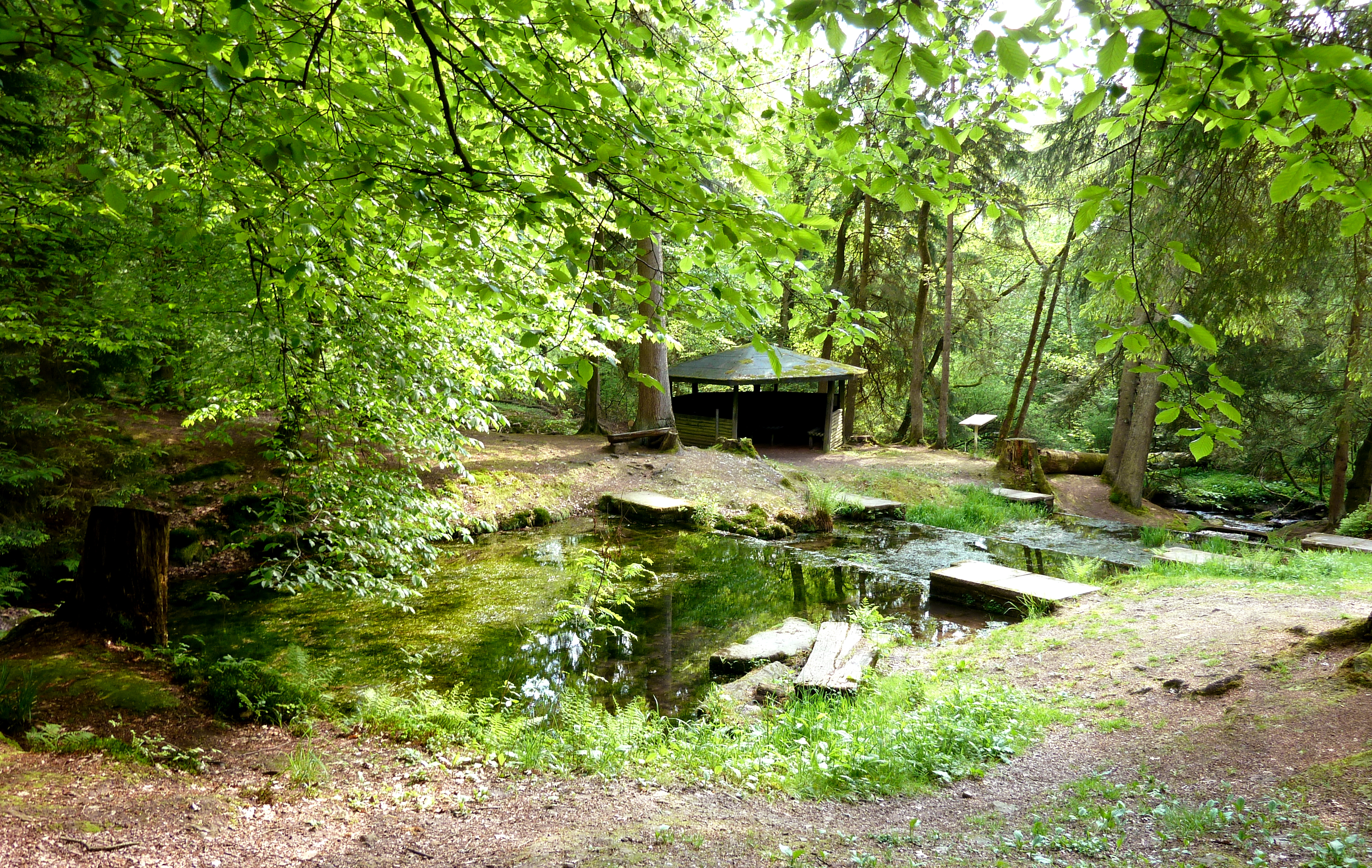
- One of the springs of Ahle in Solling

- Location of mouth

Location
- Country: Germany
- Location: Lower Saxony

Physical characteristics
- Source
  - elevation: In the Solling
- Mouth
  - location: Near Uslar into the Schwülme
  - coordinates: 51.6194°N 9.6514°E
- Length: 24.7 km (15.3 mi)

Basin features
- Progression: Schwülme→ Weser→ North Sea

Ahle is a 24.7 km (15.3 mi), orographically left-hand, tributary of the Schwülme river of Lower Saxony, Germany. It flows into the Schwülme south of Uslar.

== See also ==
- List of rivers of Lower Saxony
