= Richardson v Forestry Commission of Tasmania =

- Court: High Court of Australia
- Decided: 10 March 1988
- Citations: [1988] HCA 10, (1988) 164 CLR 261

Court membership
- Judges sitting: Mason CJ, Wilson, Brennan, Deane, Dawson, Toohey & Gaudron JJ

Richardson v Forestry Commission of Tasmania is an Australian legal decision in which the High Court of Australia upheld a Commonwealth law providing interim protection of an area of Tasmanian wilderness while an inquiry assessed what parts of the wilderness should be listed for World Heritage protection.

It implemented the constitutional external affairs power for environmental protection, the last time this part of the Australian Constitution was used was in 1983 Tasmanian Dams Case.
