= Gittelde =

- Ortsteil of Bad Grund
- Flag Coat of arms
- Interactive map of Gittelde
- Location within Germany Location within Lower Saxony
- Coordinates: 51°48′01″N 10°11′15″E
- Country: Germany
- State: Lower Saxony
- District: Göttingen
- Municipality: Bad Grund

Area
  - Total: 12.55 km^{2} (4.85 sq mi)
- Elevation: 190 m (620 ft)

Population (2011-12-31)
  - Total: 1,926
  - Density: 153.5/km^{2} (397.5/sq mi)
- Time zone: UTC+01:00 (CET)
  - Summer (DST): UTC+02:00 (CEST)
- Postal codes: 37534
- Dialling codes: 05327
- Vehicle registration: OHA
- Website: www.gittelde.de

Gittelde (German pronunciation: [ˈɡɪtl̩də]) is a village and a former municipality in the district of Göttingen, in Lower Saxony, Germany. Since 1 March 2013, it is part of the municipality Bad Grund.

== History ==
Gittelde was founded in the 10th century. In a document dating from 953 the place was mentioned for the first time, and a few years later market and mint rights were awarded in 965.

== Sights ==
There are many well-preserved half-timbered houses in the center of the town, e.g. in Breite Strasse street, a comparatively broad street which might have been an oblong market as the town has never had a rectangular market place like other market towns. Lange Straße is another historic street with traditional half-timbered houses. Some houses have doors with colourful wood carvings.

St. Mauritius Church, which was founded in the Middle Ages, has a neoromanic nave dating from the 19th century. Its spire was built in a baroque style around 1700. Inside the church a gothic altar with wood carvings can be seen. St. Johannes Church which was possibly founded in the 10th century has a spire dating from 1660.

The railway station of Gittelde on the Herzberg–Seesen railway line is a historic wooden building in the southeast of the town.

The ruins of Stauffenburg Castle are worth a visit as well. The castle was founded shortly after 1050. It was used as a prison until 1778 and as a quarry afterwards.

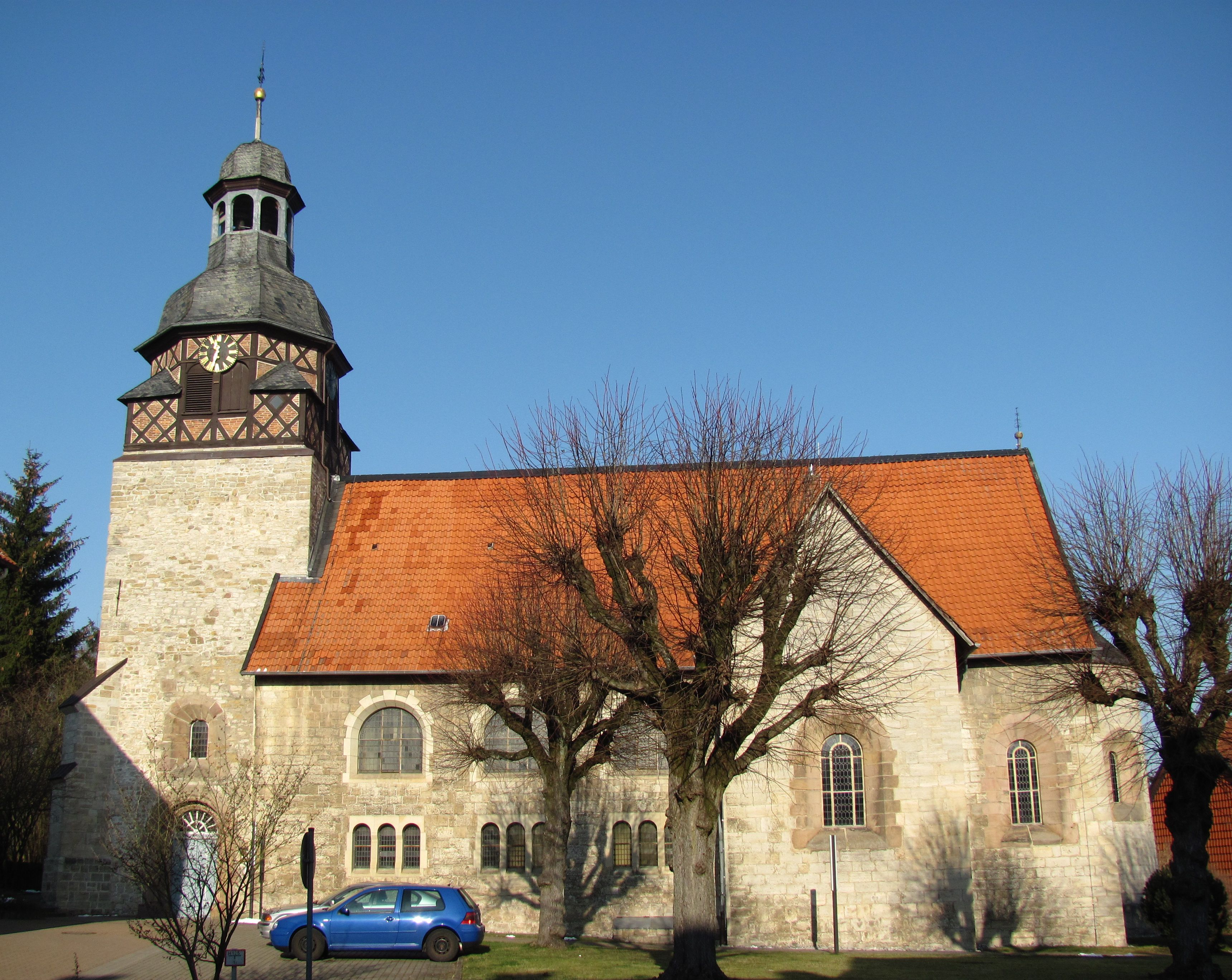
St. Mauritius Church

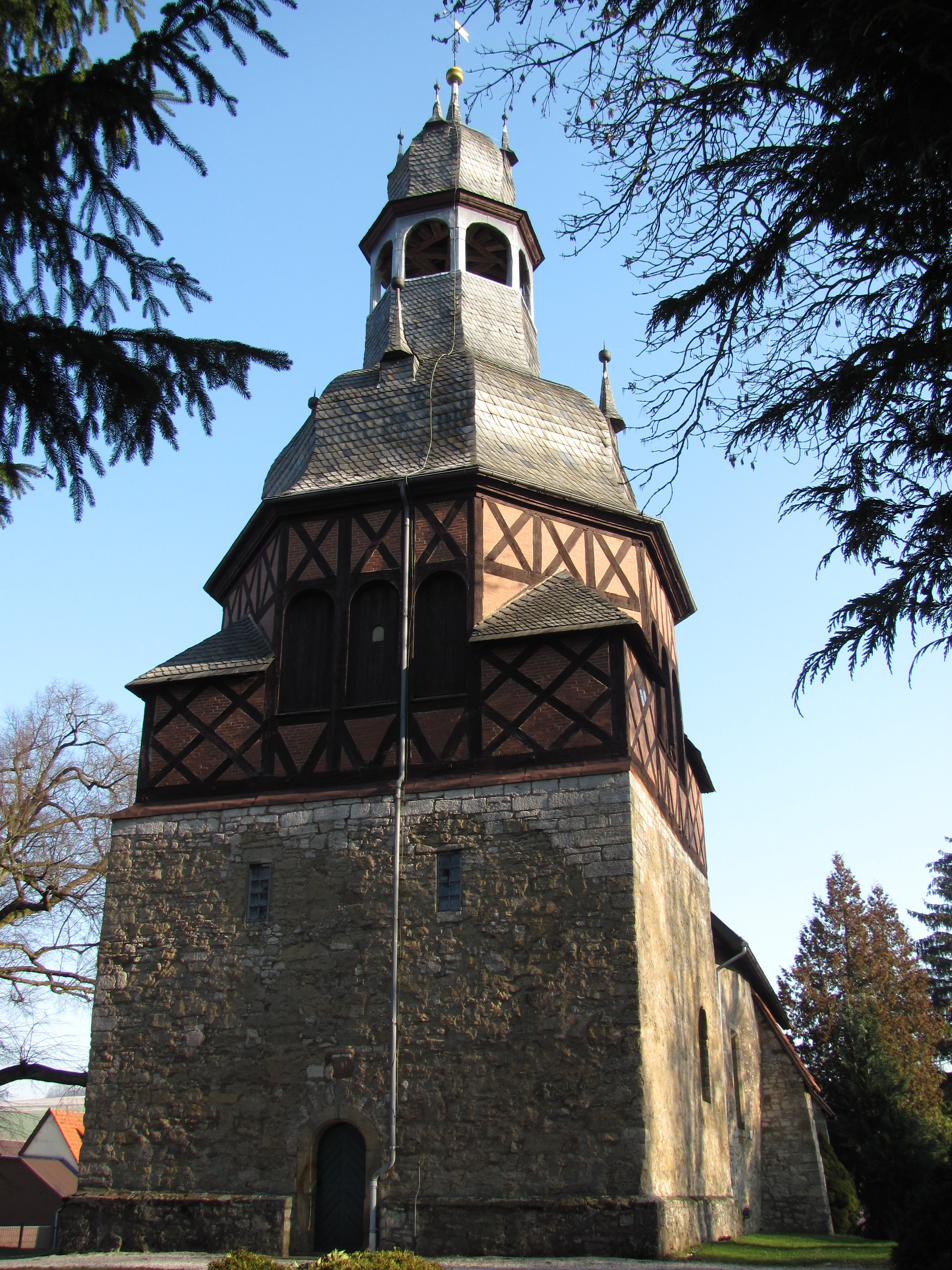
St. Johannes Church

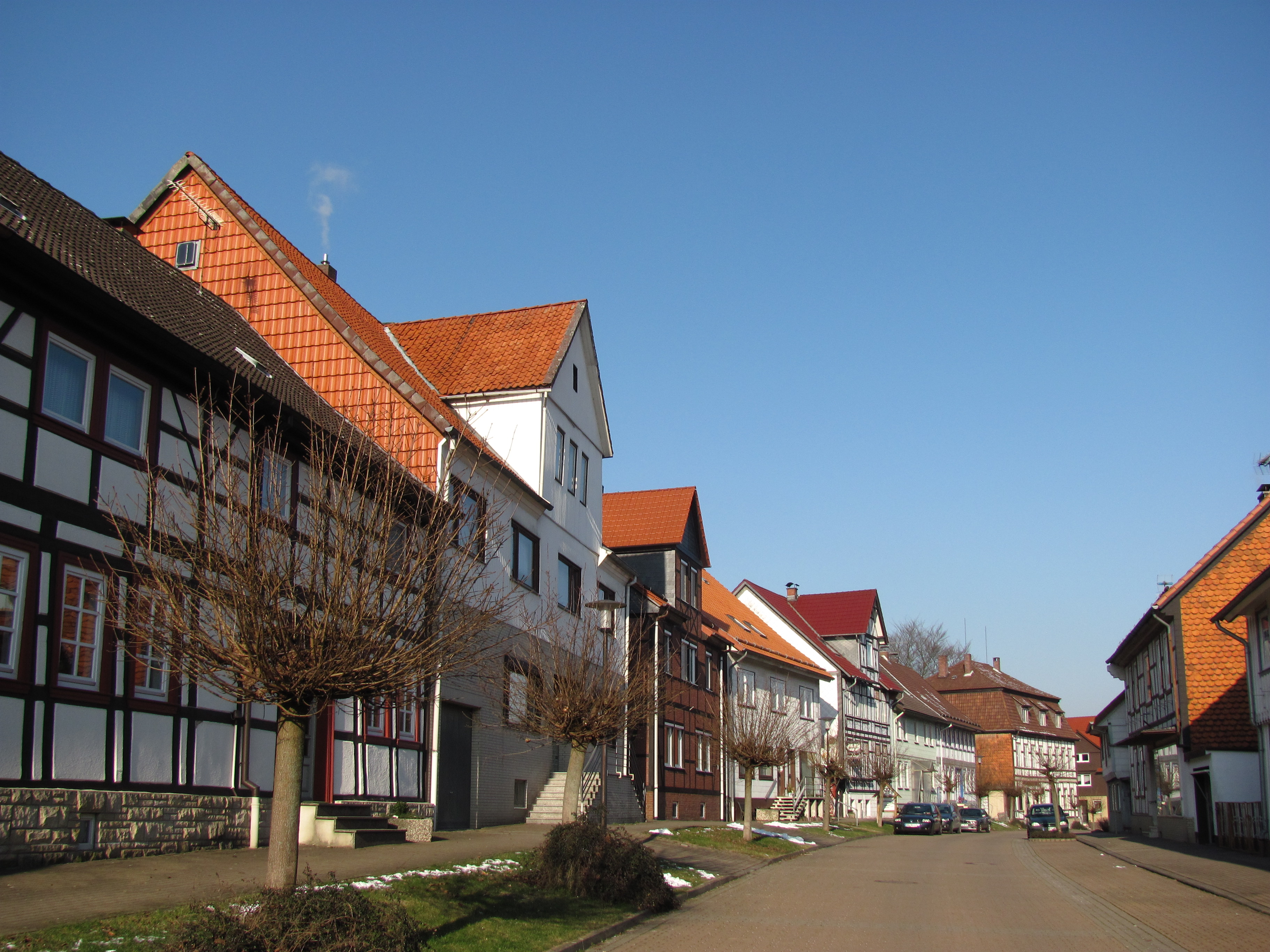
Half-timbered houses Breite Straße street

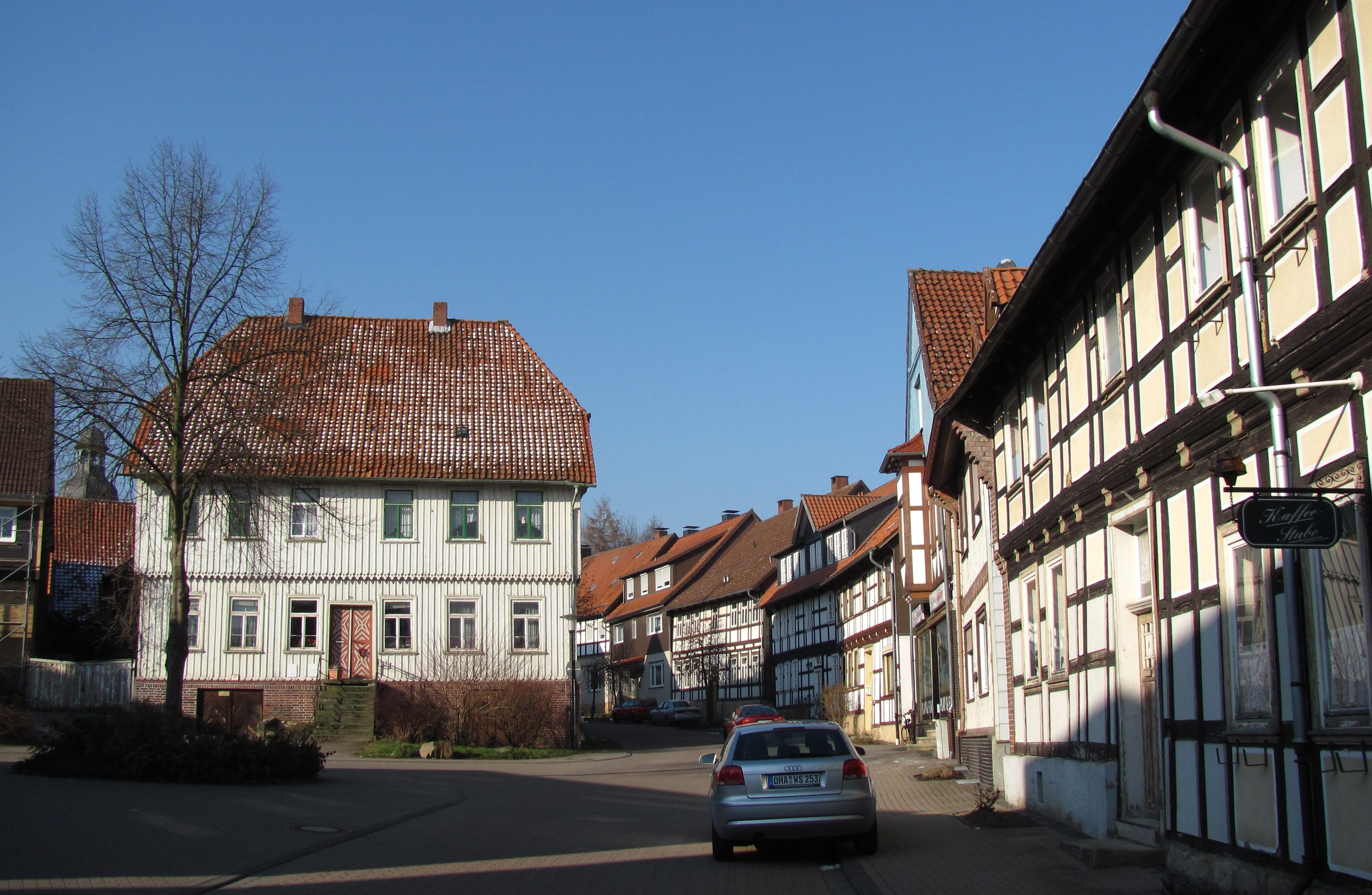
Half-timbered houses in Lange Straße street

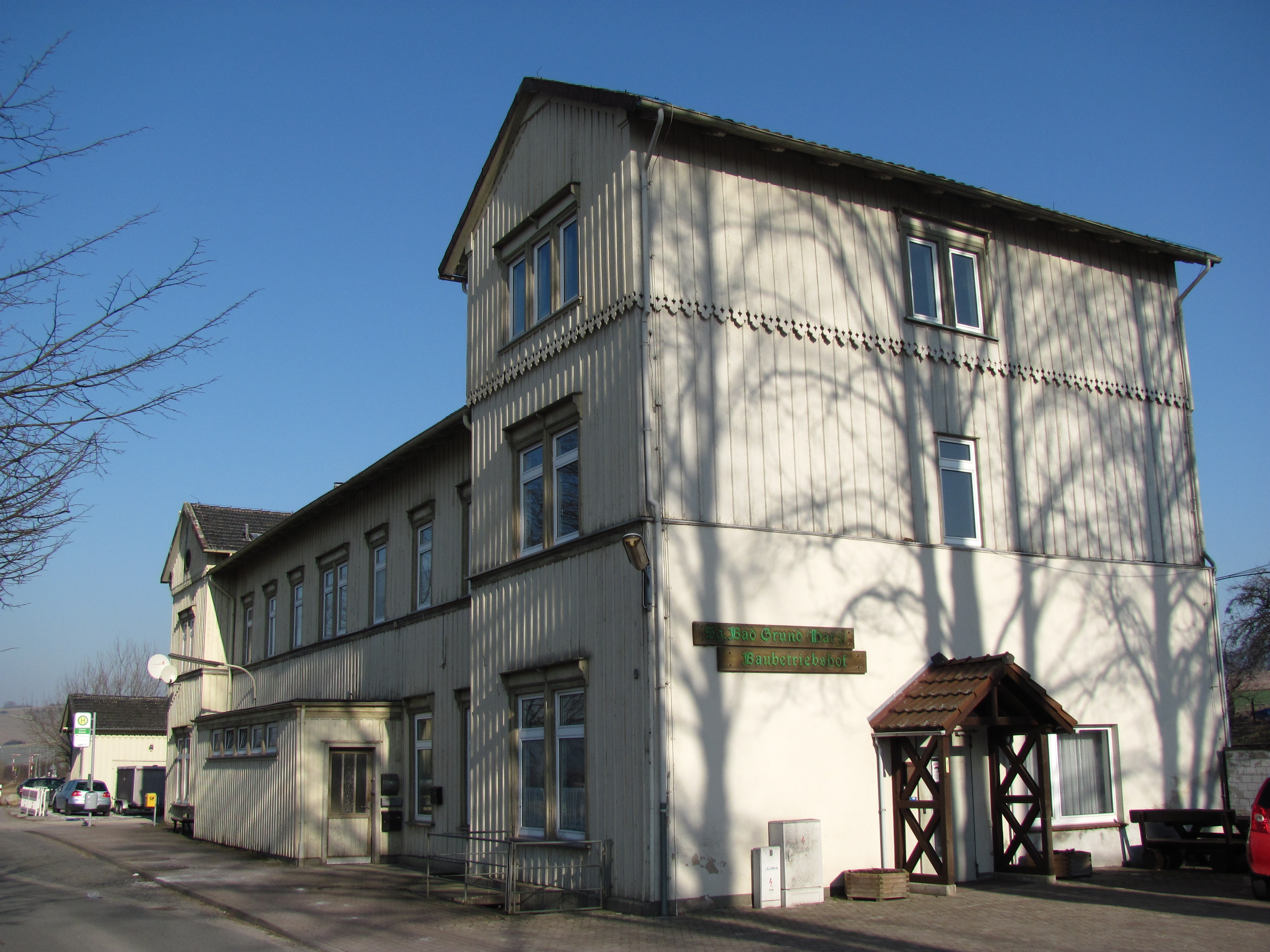
Railway station

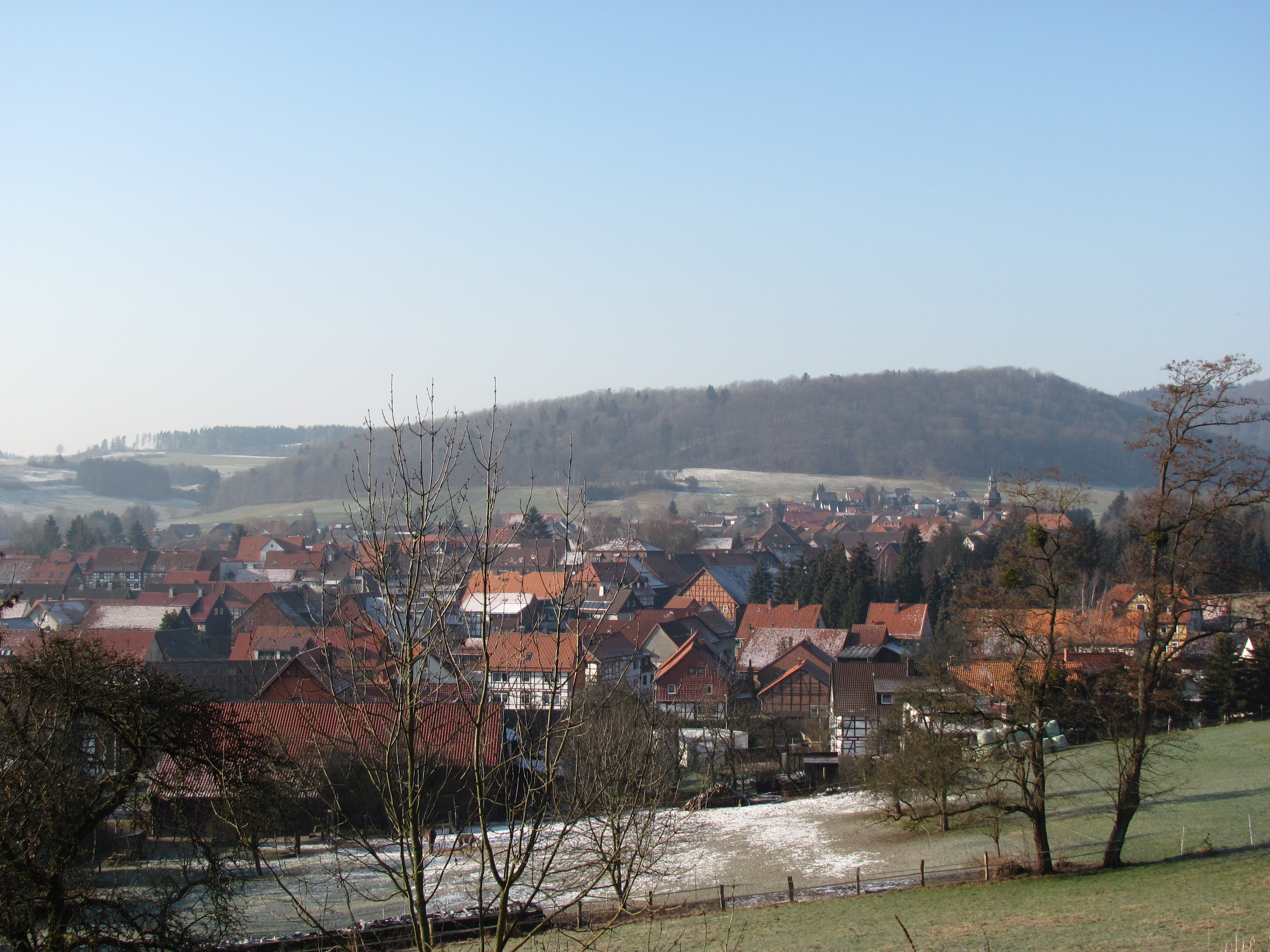
General view of Gittelde
