= Bad Grund =

Place in Lower Saxony, Germany

- Municipality
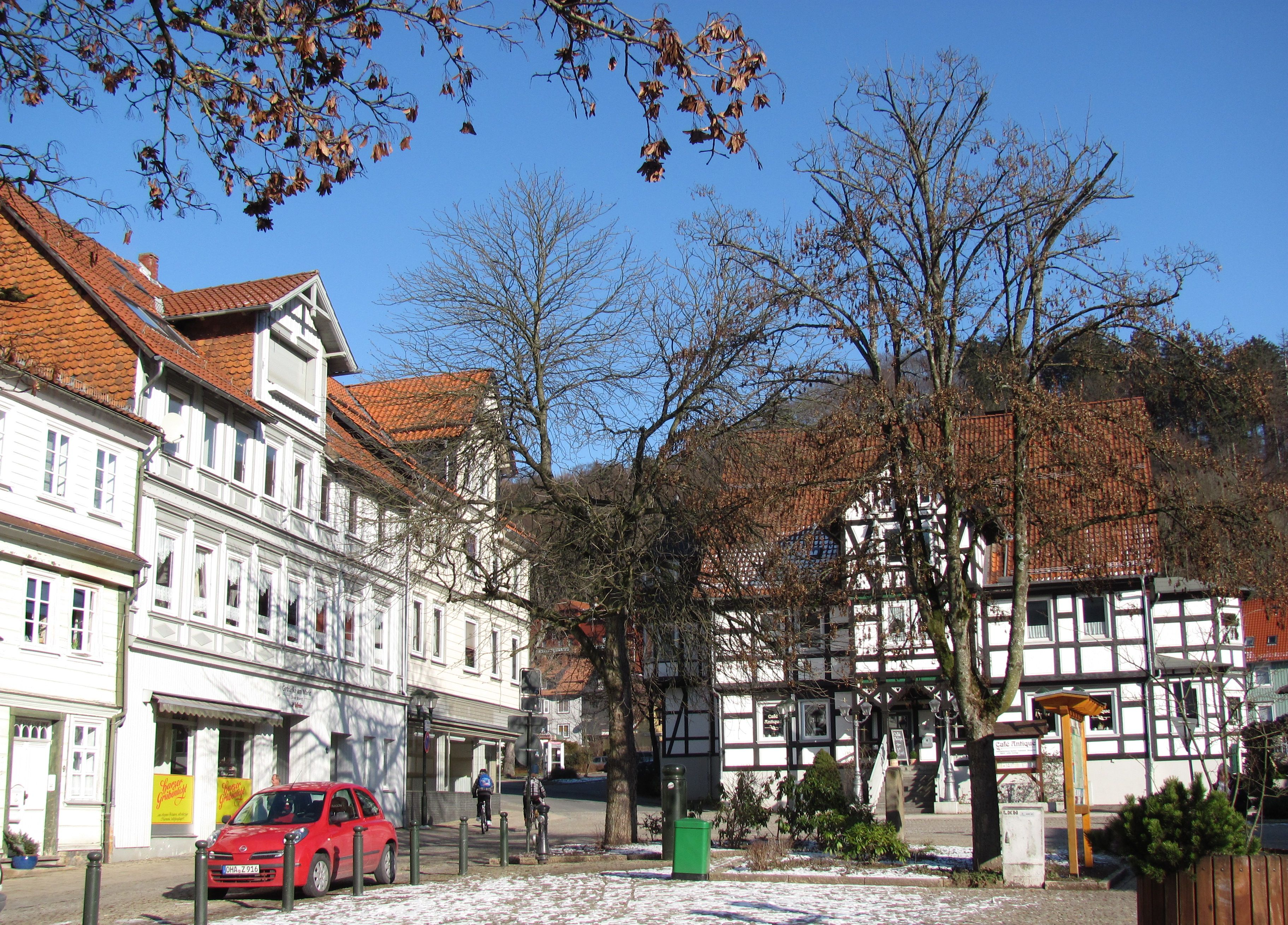
- Market square

- Flag Coat of arms

- Location of Bad Grund within Göttingen district
- Interactive map of Bad Grund
- Location within Germany Location within Lower Saxony
- Coordinates: 51°48′41″N 10°14′18″E
- Country: Germany
- State: Lower Saxony
- District: Göttingen

Government
  - Mayor (2021–26): Harald Dietzmann (SPD)

Area
  - Total: 41.31 km^{2} (15.95 sq mi)
- Elevation: 295 m (968 ft)

Population (2025-12-31)
  - Total: 7,701
  - Density: 186.4/km^{2} (482.8/sq mi)
- Time zone: UTC+01:00 (CET)
  - Summer (DST): UTC+02:00 (CEST)
- Postal codes: 37539
- Dialling codes: 05327
- Vehicle registration: GÖ, OHA
- Website: www.gemeinde-bad-grund.de

Bad Grund (Harz) (German pronunciation: [baːt ˈɡʁʊnt]) is a municipality in the district of Göttingen, in Lower Saxony, Germany. It is situated in the western Harz, approx. 7 km west of Clausthal-Zellerfeld, and 10 km north of Osterode am Harz.

Bad Grund is also the name of the former Samtgemeinde ("collective municipality") Bad Grund, of which Bad Grund formed part. It was disbanded in March 2013 and replaced by the Einheitsgemeinde Bad Grund.

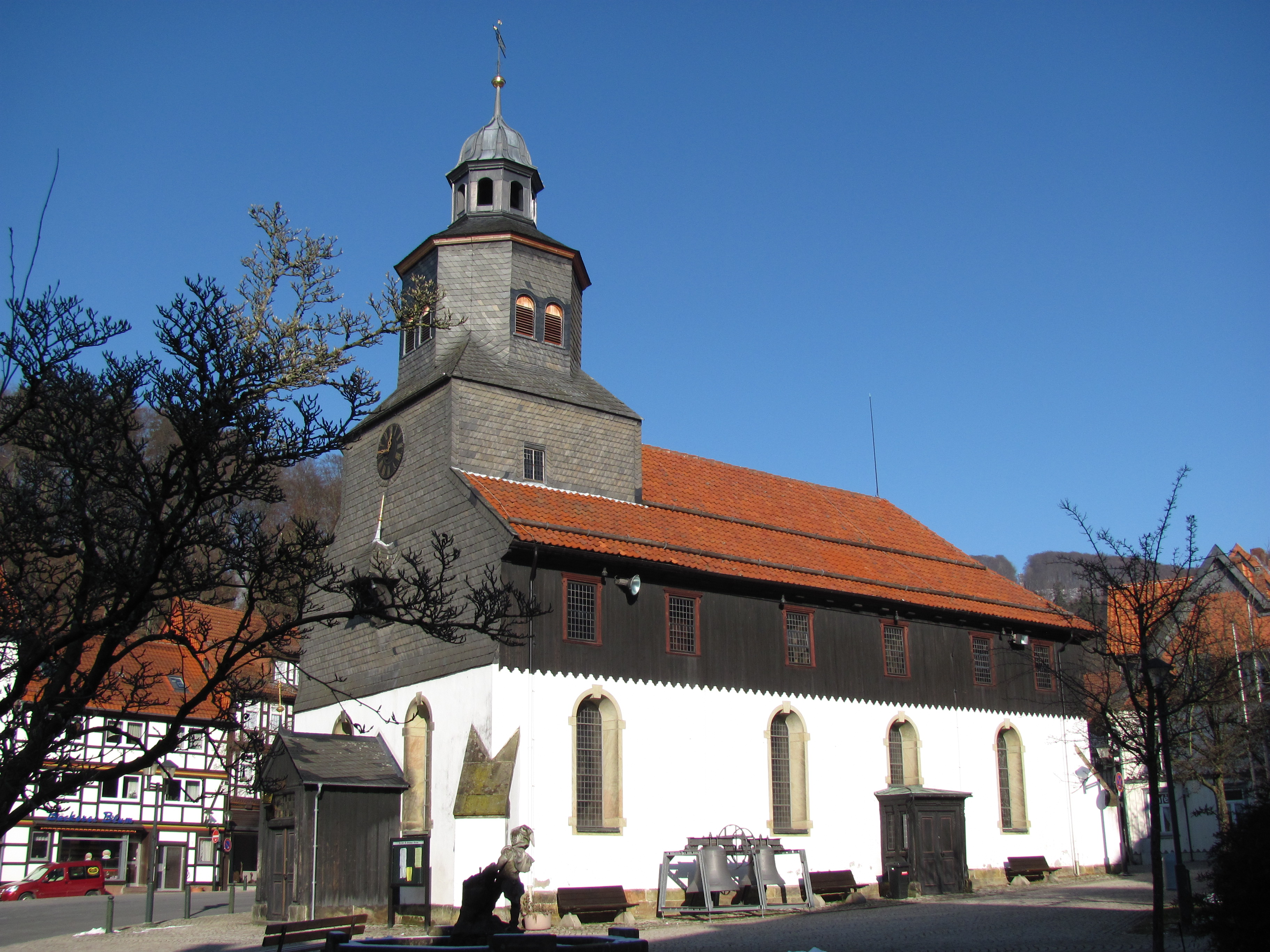
St. Antony's Church

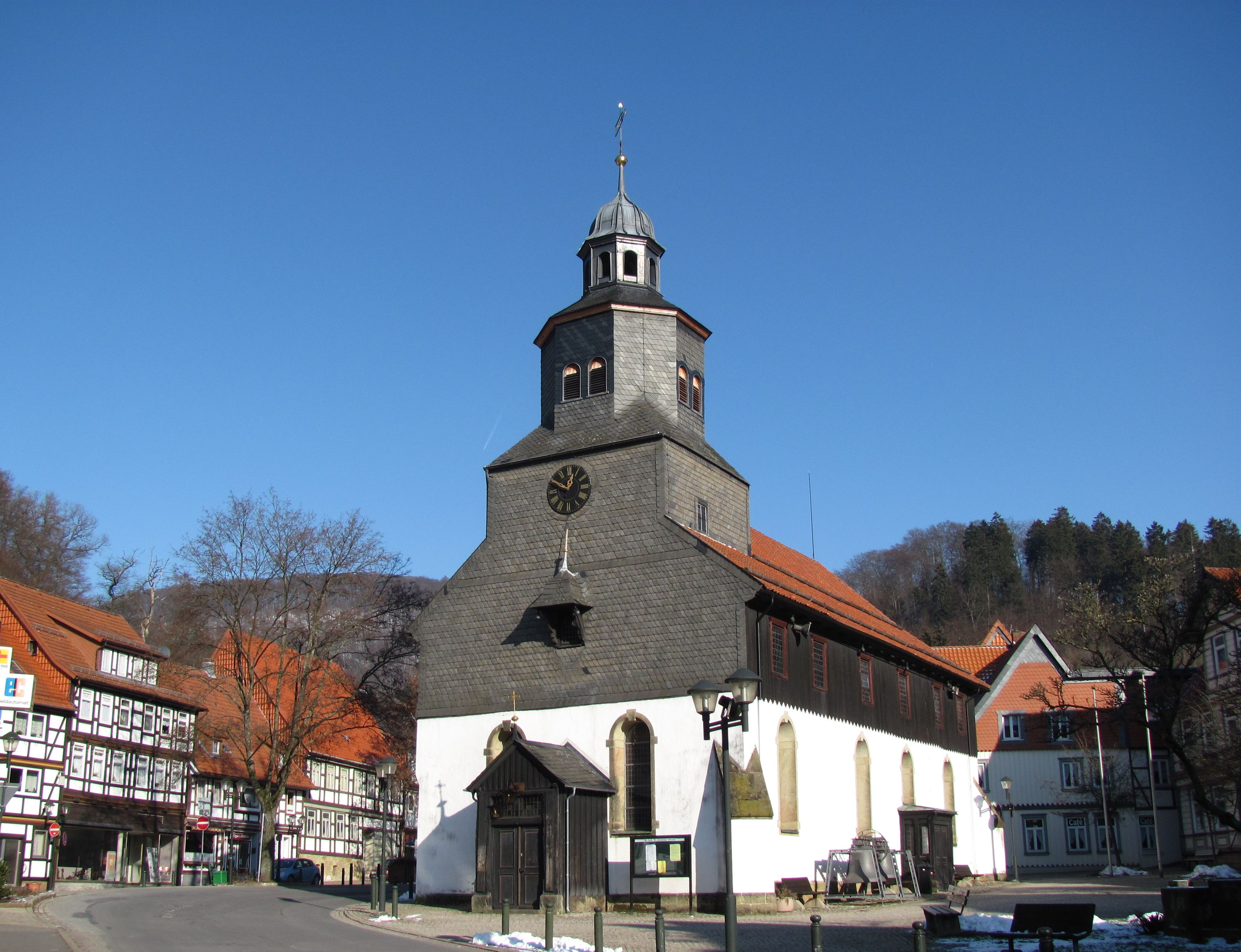
Market Place

== Points of interest ==
- Historic Market Place
- St. Antony's Church was built in 1540. The church is surrounded by half-timbered houses dating from the 17th, 18th and 19th centuries
- WeltWald Harz
- Hübichenstein
- Hilfe Gottes Mine
- Iberger Tropfsteinhöhle
