= Canadian Christian Meditation Community =

The Canadian Christian Meditation Community (CCMC) is part of the World Community for Christian Meditation (WCCM), which was founded in 1991 to foster the teachings of Benedictine monk and priest, Fr. John Main, O.S.B. (1926–1982). Fr. Main taught a way of Christian meditation which he based on parallels he saw between the spiritual practice taught by Desert Father John Cassian and the meditative practice he had been taught by the Swami Satyanandain in Kuala Lumpur. In 1977, Fr. John started a small Benedictine community in Montreal, Quebec, Canada, thus bringing this form of contemplative prayer to Canada. The Canadian Community's national office is located in Montreal.

The current director of the WCCM is Fr. Laurence Freeman, O.S.B., O.C., a student of John Main and a Benedictine monk of the Olivetan Congregation. On July 1, 2009, Michaëlle Jean, Governor General of Canada, announced the appointment of Fr. Freeman as an Officer of the Order of Canada.

The Community is a "monastery without walls", a family of national communities and emerging communities in over a hundred countries. The foundation of the Community is the local meditation group, which meets weekly in homes, parishes, offices, hospitals, prisons, and colleges. The World and Canadian Communities work closely with many Christian denominations and other faiths.

The Canadian Community sponsors retreats, schools for the training of teachers of meditation, lectures and other programs. A national quarterly spiritual and news publication of the Canadian Community is mailed to members and also available online. Information on current programs, connections to national coordinators and the location of meditation groups can be found on the Community website.

Medio Media is the communication and publishing arm of the World and Canadian Communities and offers a wide range of books, audio and videos to support the practice of meditation. The online bookstore is at Medio Media.

Fr. Main taught the practice and discipline of Christian meditation as follows:

Sit down. Sit still and upright. Close your eyes lightly. Sit relaxed but alert. Silently, interiorly begin to say a single word. We recommend the prayer phrase maranatha. Recite it as four syllables of equal length. Ma-ra-na-tha. Listen to it as you say it, gently but continuously. Do not think or imagine anything - spiritual or otherwise. If thoughts and images come, these are distractions at the time of meditation, so keep returning to simply saying the word. Meditate each morning and evening for twenty to thirty minutes.
