= Ealing Abbey =

Coordinates: 51.519477°N 0.308655°W

- The Church and Abbey of Saint Benedict of Nursia
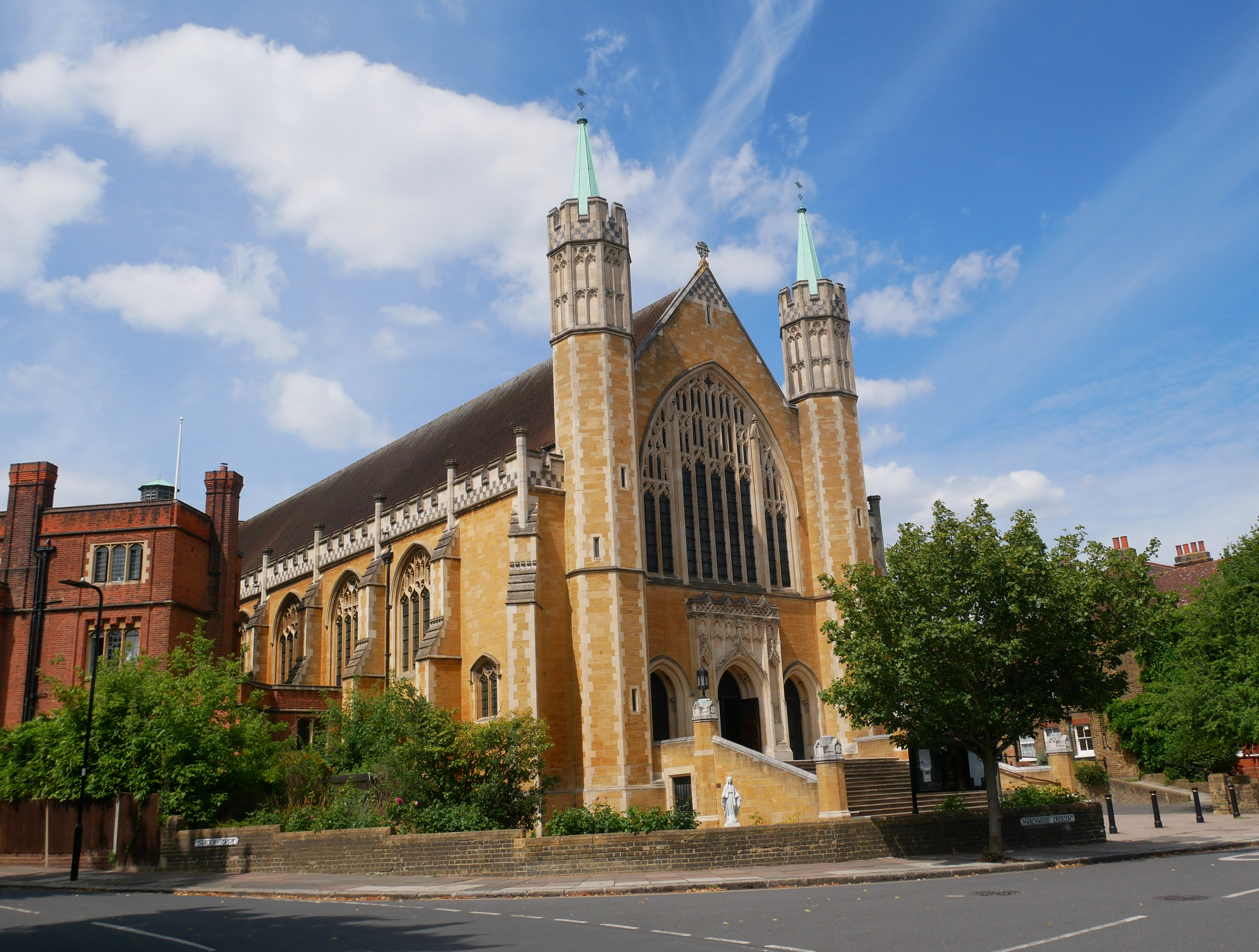
- The Abbey Church – front

- Location with the Borough of Ealing
- OS grid reference: TQ1742781453
- Location: Ealing, London
- Country: England
- Denomination: Roman Catholic
- Website: ealingmonks.org.uk

History
- Founded: March 1897
- Founder: Cardinal Herbert Vaughan
- Dedication: Saint Benedict of Nursia

Architecture
- Functional status: Active
- Heritage designation: Grade II
- Designated: 19 January 1981
- Architect: Frederick Walters
- Style: Perpendicular Gothic

Administration
- Province: Westminster
- Archdiocese: Westminster
- Deanery: Ealing

Clergy
- Archbishop: Most Rev. Vincent Nichols
- Abbot: Reverend Dominic Taylor O.S.B.

The Abbey of Ealing is a Roman Catholic Benedictine monastery located on Castlebar Hill in Ealing, England. It is part of the English Benedictine Congregation.

The shrine is dedicated to Saint Benedict of Nursia. In 2020, the Abbey had fourteen residential monks.

== History ==
The monastery at Ealing was founded in 1897 from Downside Abbey, originally as a parish in the Archdiocese of Westminster. It was canonically erected as a dependent priory in 1916 and raised again to the rank of independent conventual priory in 1947.

Pope Pius XII raised the building to the status of an abbey in 1955.

=== The building ===
The architect of the Abbey Church, a Grade II Listed building, was F A Walters. Two or three bays in the nave were open by 1899 and part of the monastery in use by 1905. By 1915 the sanctuary and Lady Chapel together with more bays were completed. The west end together with the four western bays were completed by 1934 by Edward John Walters, the son of F A Walters.

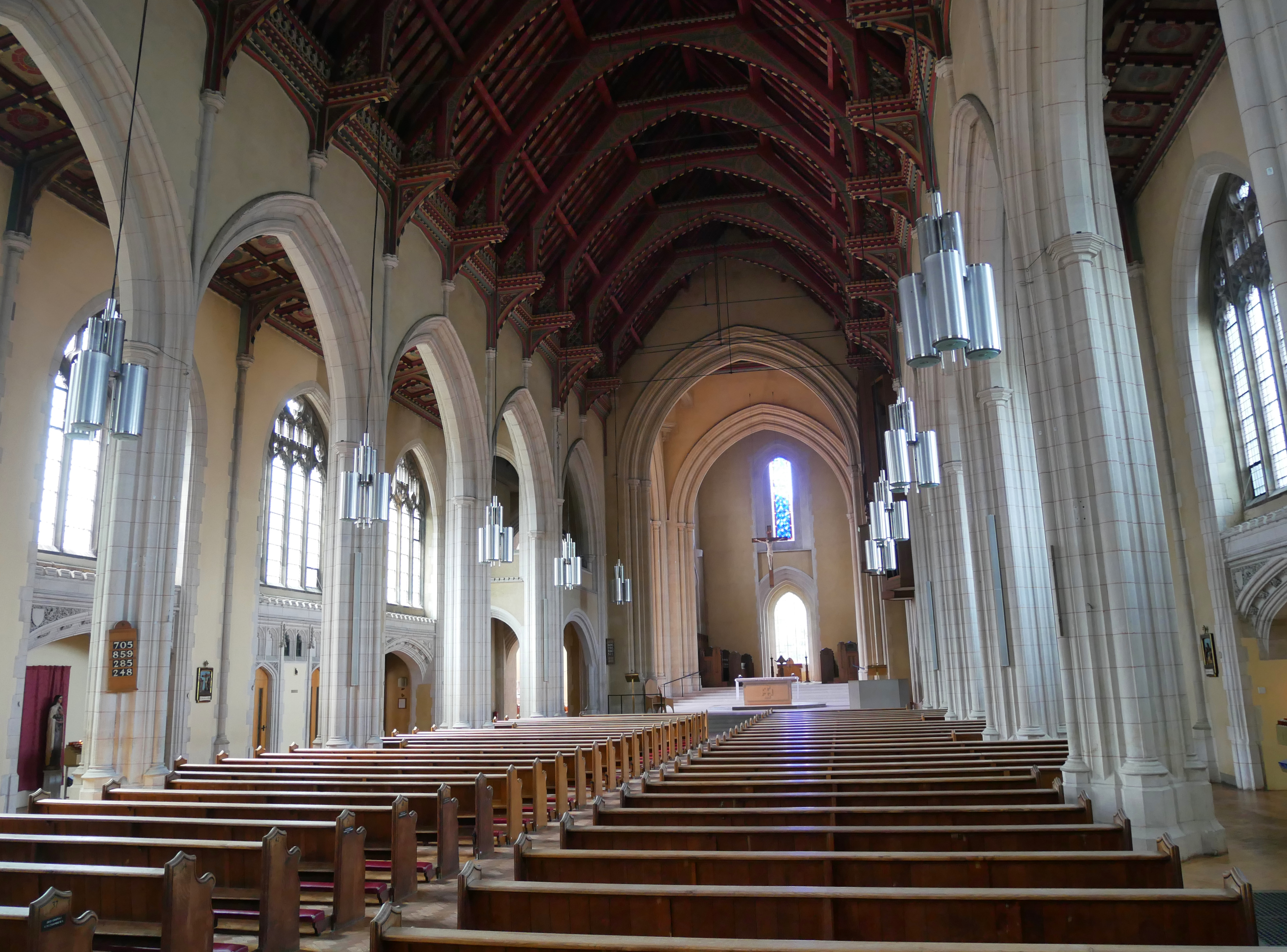
Nave of the Church of Saint Benedict, part of the abbey

Two bombs damaged the church in 1940. The first destroyed the organ chamber and the War Memorial Chapel. The second destroyed the east end, including the sanctuary and choir. Only two stained glass windows survived, although damaged.

Restoration of war damage was started in 1957 and completed by 1962. The church was enlarged and the transepts completed by Stanley Kerr Bate. The Monks Choir beyond the crossing and Lady Chapel were added in 1996-98 to the designs of Sir William Whitfield.

The single hammerbeam nave roof has a painted decoration, with the monograms IHC and SB (for St Benedict).

The large west window, depicting the Coronation of the Virgin attended by the heavenly host, is by Burlison and Grylls. The window in the south transept, a memorial to victims of two world wars, is by Ninian Comper and William Bucknall (c.1960). It depicts a beardless Risen Christ and Saints David, George, Andrew and Patrick.

There is a painting of Peter's Denial of Christ by Jusepe de Ribera.

== Apostolate ==
=== Parish ===
One of the main apostolates of the Abbey is running a major parish in Ealing centred on the Abbey Church of Saint Benedict where both the parish and monastic liturgies take place.

=== Music ===
Ealing Abbey Choir of boys' and men's voices sings at the Sunday Conventual Mass. The choir appeared in the BBC television programme Songs of Praise in 2005.

The Abbey has an active programme of music recitals, which include the choirs and the organ. Occasional concerts by other choirs are also held.

The Lay Plainchant Choir gives lay people the opportunity to practise and sing chant. The choir provides opportunities for workshops and training. The choir has weekly rehearsals and sings monthly at a Sunday Mass. Those members available also sing periodically at a local care home for elderly people suffering from dementia.

=== Hospitality ===
The monks of Ealing accept clerical and lay men as guests in the monastery, on the understanding that guests will attend morning mass and evening vespers with the monks. Residential and non residential guests are welcome at the sung liturgy of the hours in the Abbey Church and the monks have a house for guests and retreatants.

=== School ===
A major work of the Abbey in the past has been teaching and administration in St Benedict's School, founded as Ealing Priory School in 1902 by Sebastian Cave. This is an independent day school for boys and, since 2007, girls at both the junior and senior levels. There is also a small co-educational nursery. Since 1987 the Abbey has engaged a lay headmaster for the school having previously provided the headmaster from foundation. In 2012 the trust of St Benedict, Ealing created a new charitable trust, St Benedict's School, and passed school administration to a new board of governors. As a result, members of the monastic community are more free to choose different apostolates. The Abbey also has close links with the nearby girls' school St Augustine's Priory, a former convent school.

==== Sex abuse scandal ====
In April 2006, civil damages were awarded jointly against David Pearce, a former head of the junior school at St Benedicts, and Ealing Abbey in the High Court in relation to an alleged assault by Pearce on a pupil while teaching at St Benedict's School in the 1990s, although criminal charges were dropped. Pearce was charged in November 2008 with 24 counts of indecent assault, sexual touching and gross indecency with six boys aged under 16, relating to incidents before and after 2003, the date when a new offence of sexual touching was created. Pleading guilty at Isleworth Crown Court to offences going back to 1972, Pearce was jailed for eight years in October 2009, subsequently reduced to five years, for sexual abuse offences at the school from 1972 to 1992 and for one offence in 2007 after he had ceased to work in the school.

The conduct of the Ealing monastic community, as trustee of the St. Benedict's Trust, was examined by the Charity Commission, which found it had failed to take adequate measures to protect beneficiaries of the charity from Pearce.

In March 2011, Dom Laurence Soper, a former Abbot of Ealing Abbey, was arrested on child abuse charges relating to the period when he was a teacher at, and the bursar of, St Benedict's School. In 2016, he was arrested in Kosovo and extradited to the UK to face trial. In December 2017, following a 10-week trial, Soper was found guilty on 19 counts of child sexual abuse including buggery, indecency with a child and indecent assault. He was sentenced to 18 years imprisonment.

Following these incidents and other alleged offences, Abbot Shiperlee commissioned a report from Lord Carlile of Berriew with a view to making recommendations on the School's governance. As a result of the changes made the Independent Schools Inspectorate said in its 2013 inspection report that the pastoral care at St Benedict's was excellent.

In 2018-2019, the Independent Inquiry into Child Sexual Abuse (IICSA) was investigating institutional failures to protect children from sexual abuse in the Catholic Church in England and Wales, including complaints about Catholic schools and specifically investigations at Ealing Abbey and St Benedict's school. The Pope's representative in Britain, archbishop Edward Adams, refused to co-operate with the enquiry.

In February 2019, Martin Shipperlee, abbot of Ealing Abbey, resigned over a failure to investigate child sexual abuse allegations.

=== Benedictine Study and Arts Centre, renamed Benedictine Institute ===
The monks of Ealing also run the Benedictine Institute, which was originally suggested in 1986 by Francis Rossiter, the Abbot, and opened in 1992 by Laurence Soper, then Abbot. The present Abbot, Martin Shipperlee, has continued his support since his election in 2000. The Institute, which is endorsed and supported by the Archdiocese of Westminster, has developed and provides a Liberal Arts programme of adult education and a programme of Sacred Liturgy, with some officially validated courses. The studies pursued now focus upon Sacred Liturgy and the Liberal Arts, including theology (go to directory of institutions) and both modern and classical languages, of which the Latin summer school has become a regular feature of the annual programme.

The Benedictine Institute, an umbrella for The Liturgy Institute of England and Wales (Institutum Liturgicum), St Bede Library, Ealing Abbey Pottery and London Spring are housed in Overton House, a Victorian mansion property in Castlebar Road adjacent to the Abbey built by John M. Bartholomew, son of the founder of John Bartholomew and Son, the map-maker and publisher of atlases; the name of "J.M. Bartholomew" features in some carved stones in the walls of the garden. The property was purchased by Downside Abbey in 1930 and sold to Ealing Abbey upon its independence from Downside in 1955.

The St Bede library contains three main collections for undergraduate liberal studies and graduate study in theology and liturgy, based on a collection assembled in Oxford, London and Rome from 1978 to 1992. These were subsequently supplemented by purchase and gift, in particular by donations from members of the Alcuin Club.

From 2002 until his retirement in 2015 the Institute's principal and head of Liturgy, James Leachman, served as professor and later as tenured professor of Liturgy at the Pontifical Institute of Liturgy at Sant Anselmo in Rome. Throughout this period he directed the Institute's work; since 2010 Fr Daniel McCarthy OSB has shared much of the teaching and administration of the Liturgical Institute. The UK arm of the project, Appreciating the Liturgy (based on the encyclical Ecclesia de Eucharistia), founded and directed by James Leachman and Daniel McCarthy, a monk of St. Benedict's Abbey in Atchison, Kansas, has been housed since 2009 in the former "Scriptorum" at the Centre, originally established by Bernard Orchard in 2003.

The Centre publishes the periodical Benedictine Culture twice each year.

== Monks of Ealing ==
Ealing Abbey was the home for parts of their careers of various notable monks.

Bernard Orchard, the biblical scholar, was a distinguished monk of Ealing.

Between 1933 and 1939, David Knowles, the monastic historian and later Regius Professor of Modern History at the University of Cambridge resided there and conducted the research for his magnum opus The Monastic Order in England.

Cuthbert Butler also lived at Ealing following his retirement as Abbot of Downside from 1922 until his death in 1934. John Main, a proponent of Christian meditation, whose methods are now fostered by the World Community for Christian Meditation, was a monk of the Ealing community in the period 1959–1970 and 1974–1977.

In September 2011, the Congregation for the Doctrine of the Faith ordered an apostolic visitation of Ealing Abbey. The Abbey's safeguarding policies and procedures formed part of the remit of the visitors.

== Priors and Abbots ==
The following monks have served as Prior and, since elevation to the status of Abbey on 26 May 1955, Abbot:

Tenure	Office	Incumbent	Notes
1916 to 1925	Prior	Wulstan Pearson	Consecrated as the first Catholic Bishop of Lancaster, 25 February 1925
1925 to 1935	Prior	Benedict Kuypers	
1935 to 1938	Prior	Edward Green	Headmaster of Ealing Priory School 1917–1919
1938	Prior	Mark Pontifex	
1938 to 1945	Prior	Stanislaus Chatterton	
1945 to 1946	Prior	Ambrose Agius	Member of Ealing Community at independence from Downside, December 1947
1946 to 1955	Prior	Charles Pontifex	Member of Ealing Community at independence from Downside, December 1947; appointed as the first Abbot
1955 to 1956	Abbot	Charles Pontifex	Resigned following a car crash; died 1976
1956 to 1967	Abbot	Rupert Hall	Headmaster of Ealing Priory School 1939–1945; member of Ealing Community at independence from Downside, December 1947; died 1974
1967 to 1991	Abbot	Francis Rossiter	
1991 to 2000	Abbot	Laurence Soper	Arrested in 2011 on child abuse charges and subsequently imprisoned.
2000 to 2019	Abbot	Martin Shipperlee	Resigned over a failure to investigate child sexual abuse allegations
2019	Abbot	Dominic Taylor	

== Gallery ==
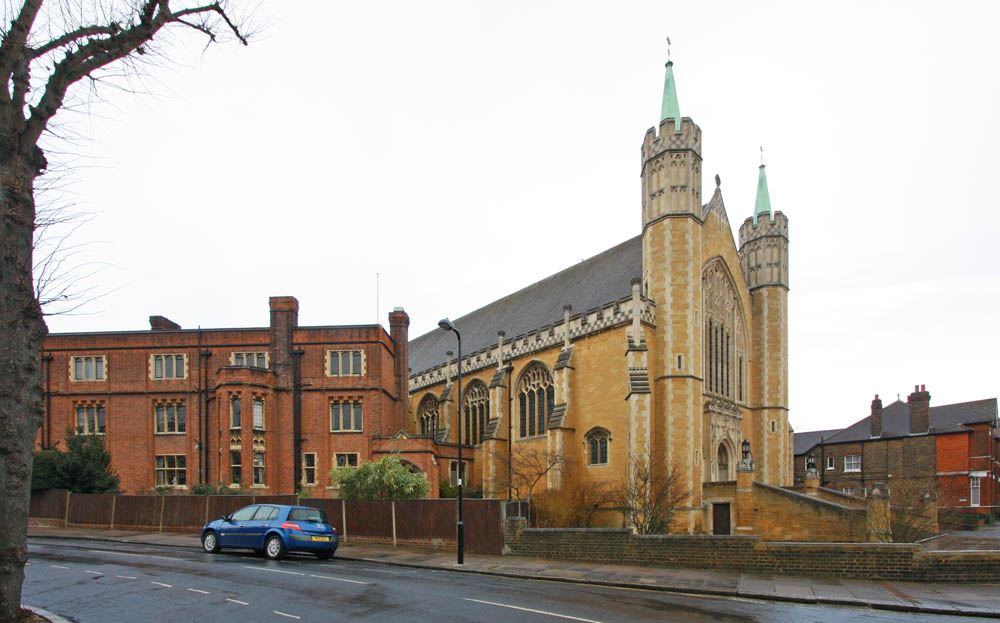
South side of the church

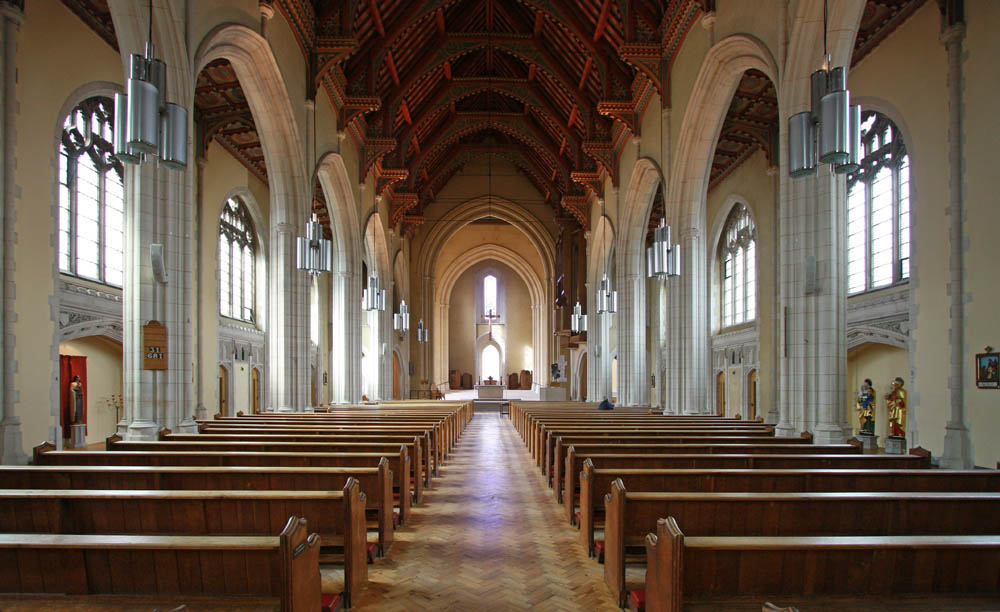
Towards the Altar

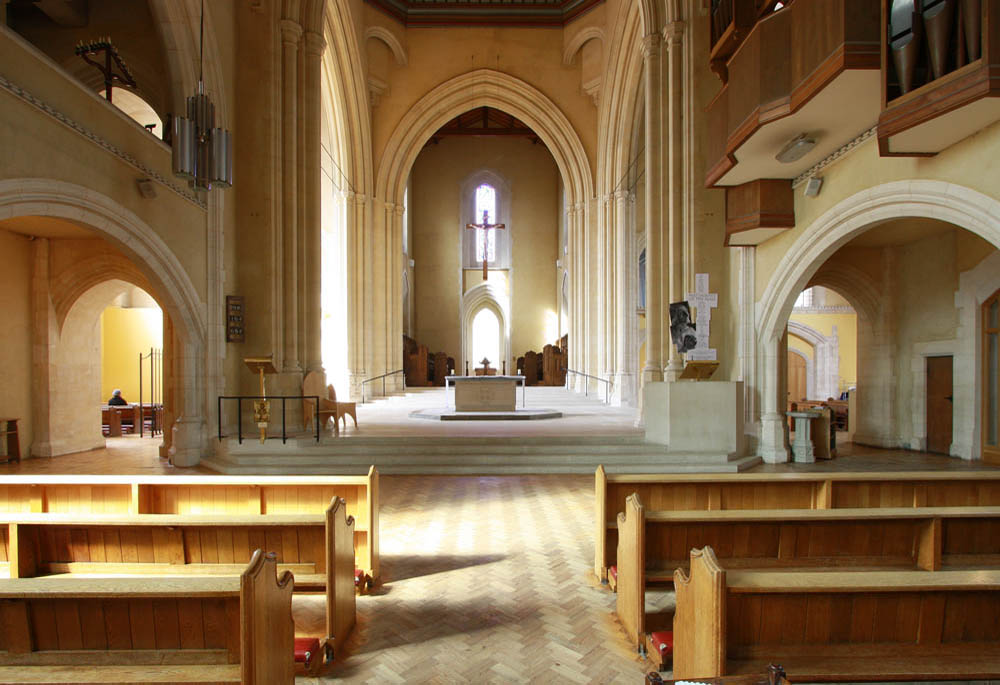
View of the Sanctuary

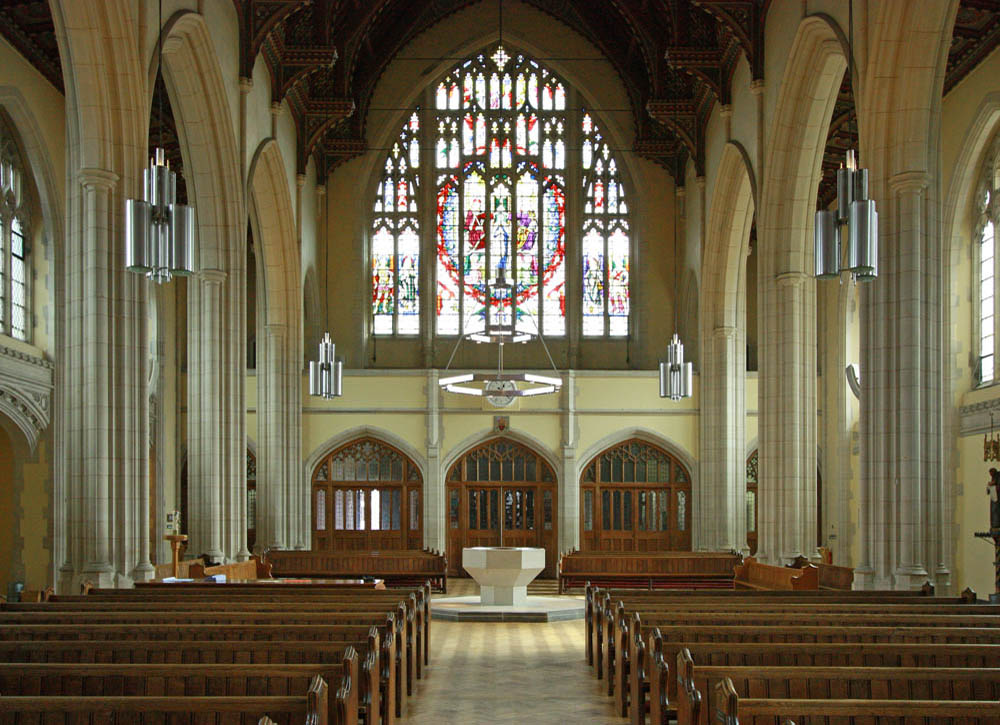
West end of the church

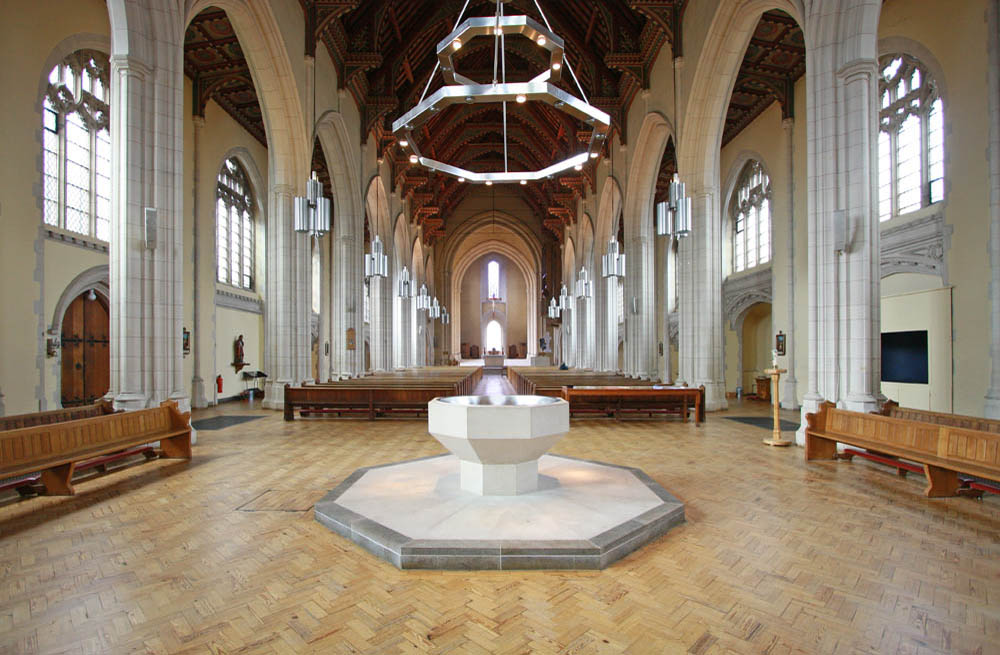
Baptismal Font

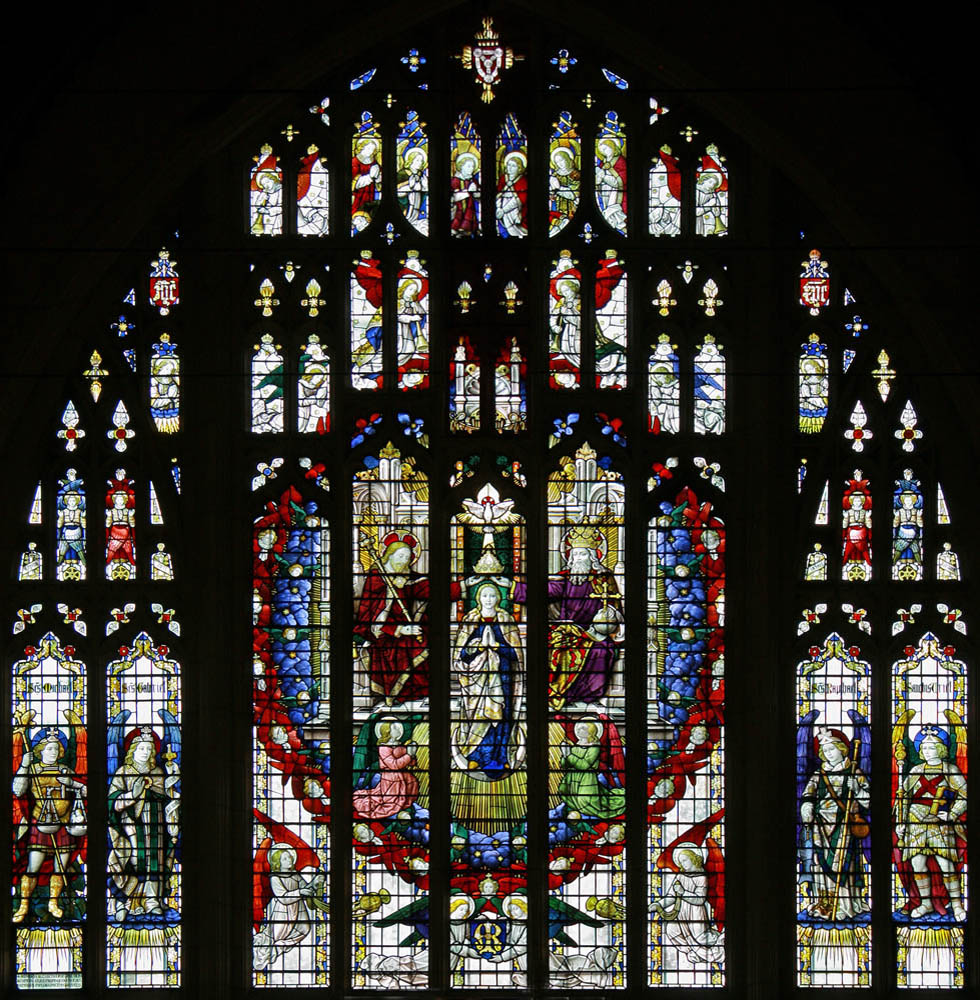
West Window

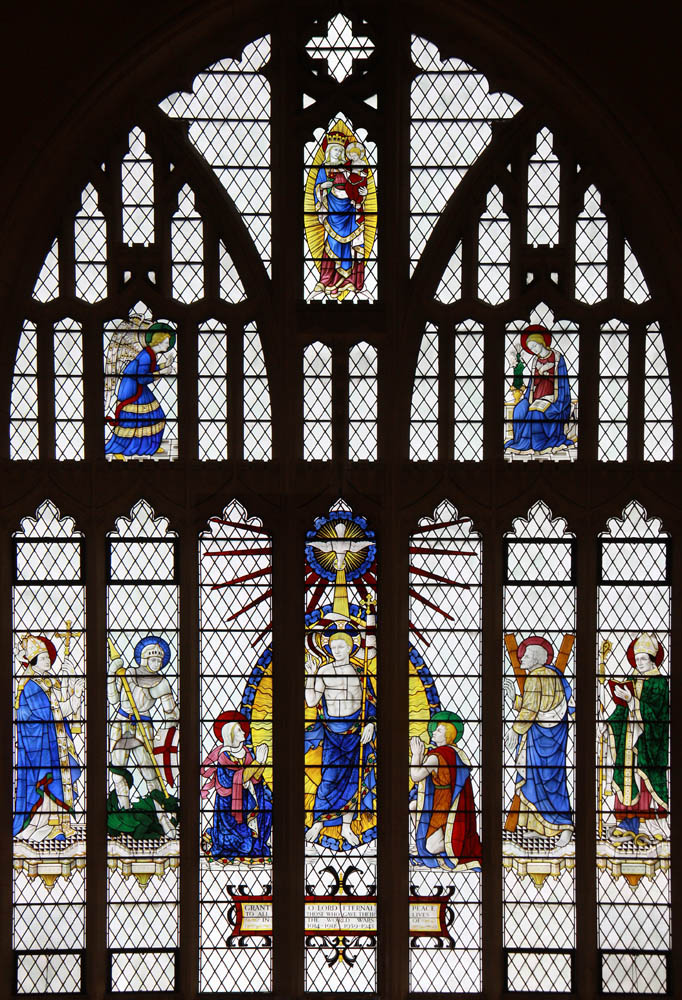
South Transept Window

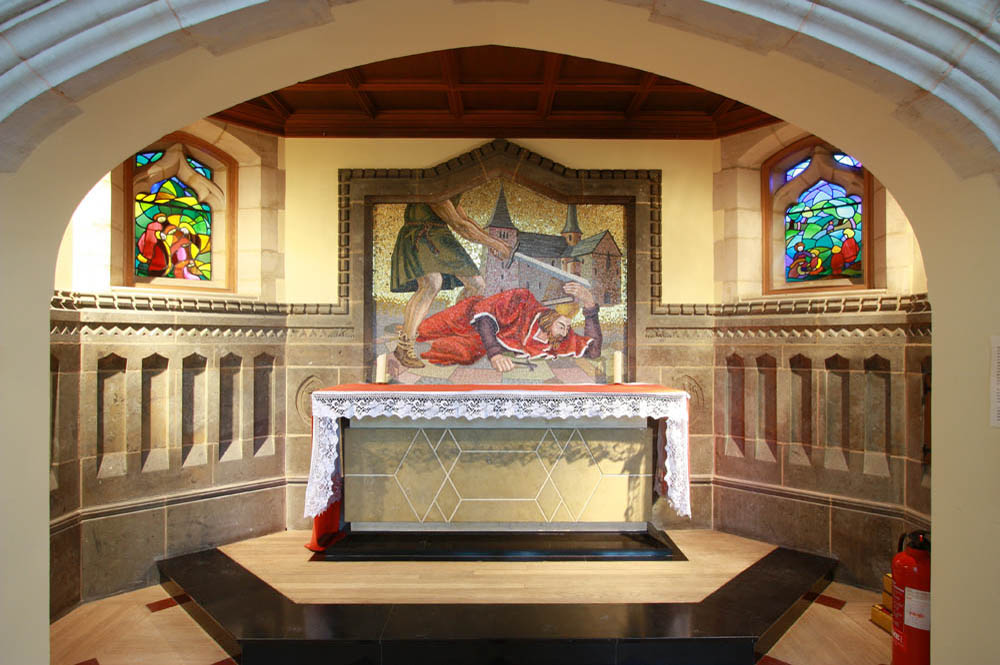
Side Altar

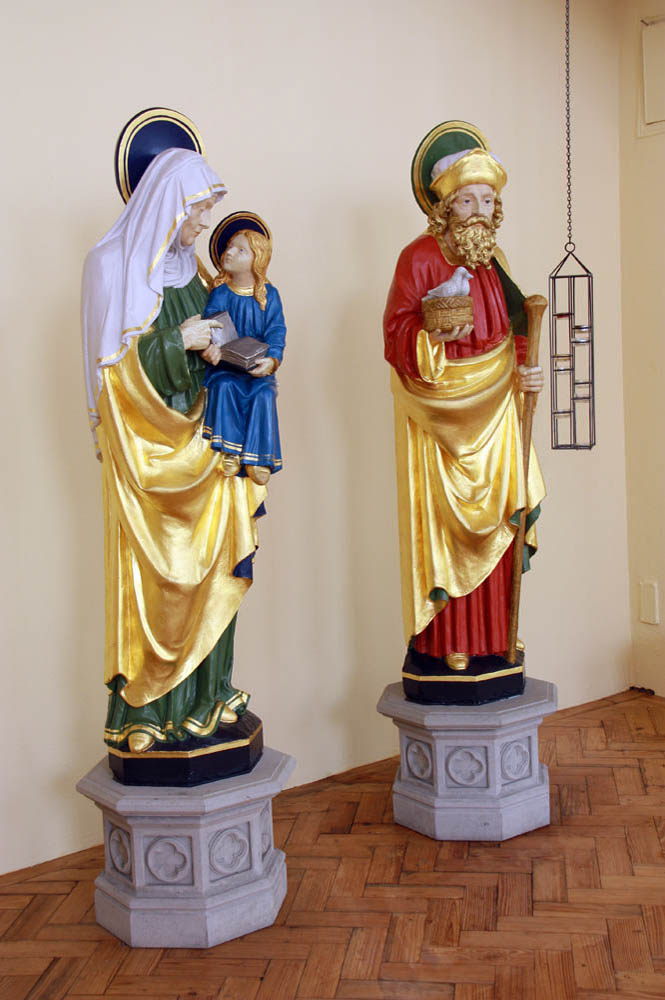
Statues within the church

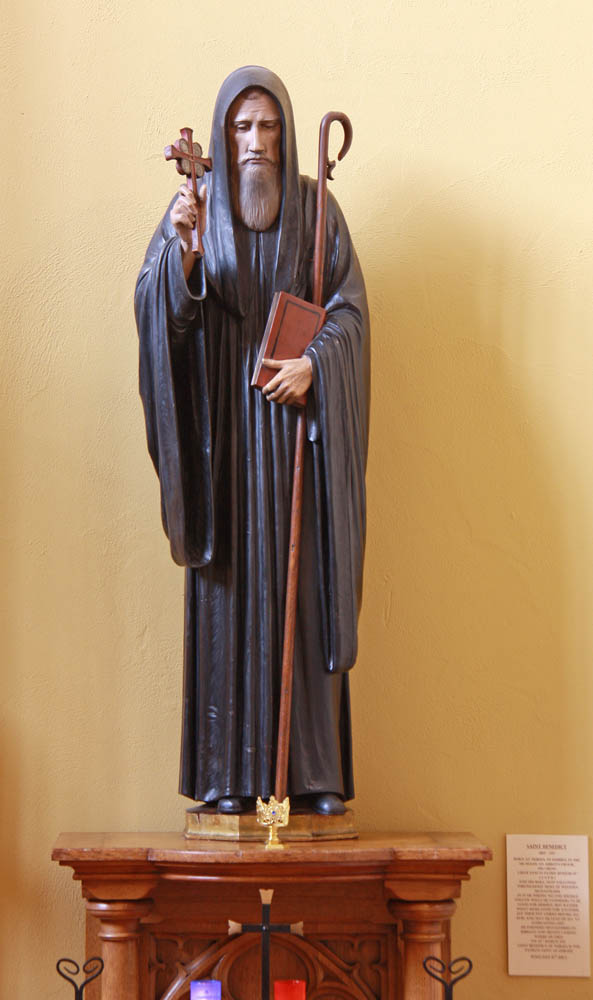
Statue of St Benedict

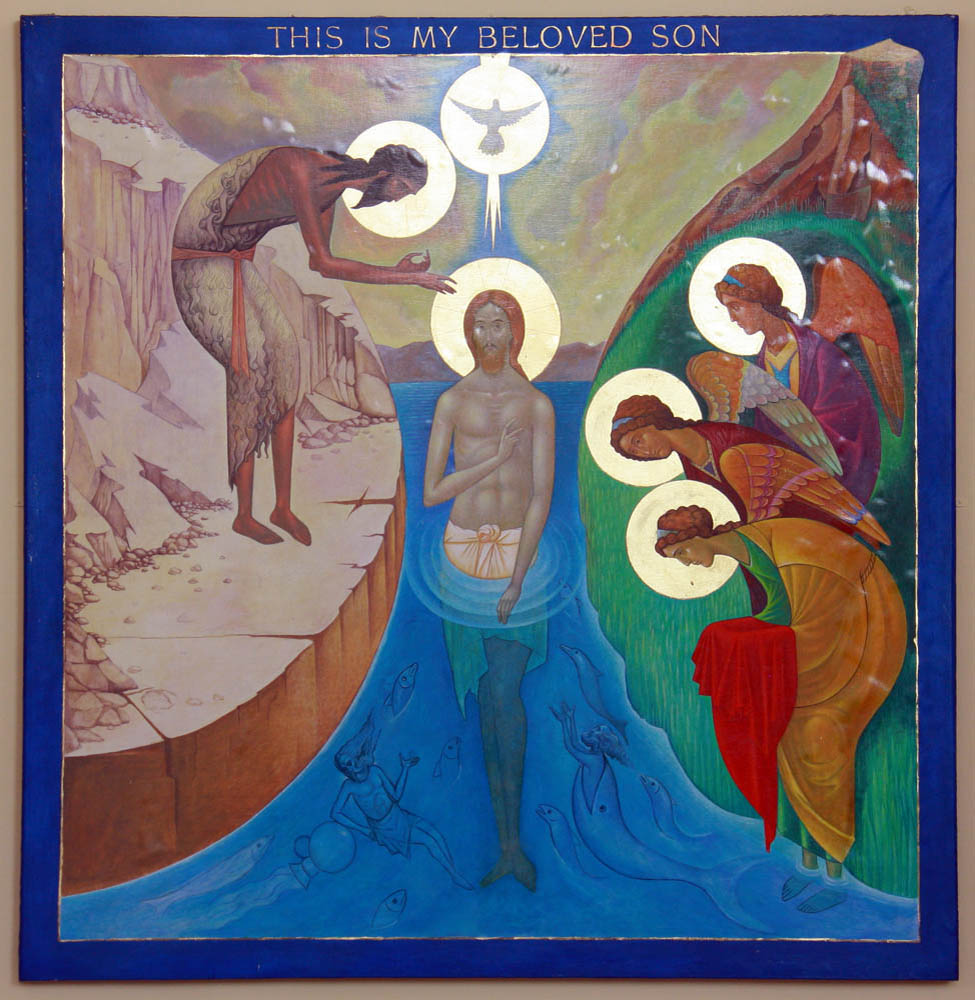
The Baptism of Christ, painting within the church

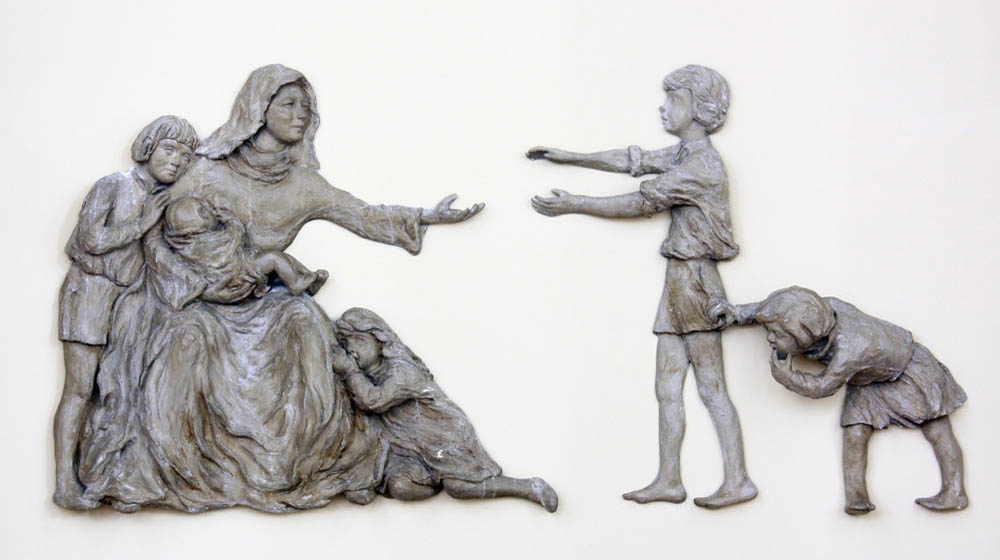
A relief within the church
