= St Benedict's School, Ealing =

St Benedict's

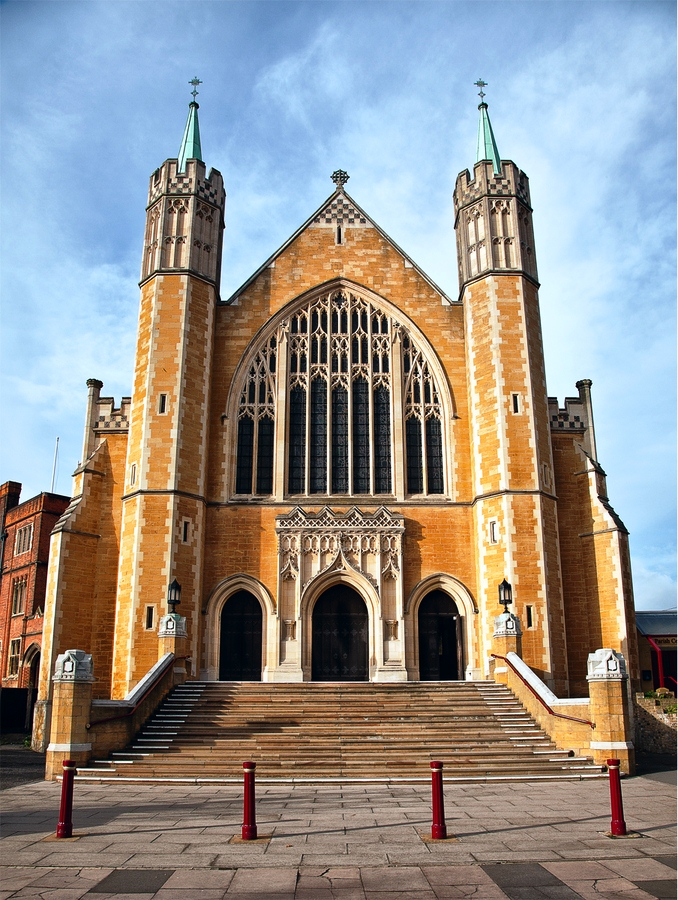
- St Benedict's School Abbey

Location
- Eaton Rise; Ealing, London, W5 2ES; United Kingdom; 51°31′16″N 0°18′25″W

Information
- Type: Private day school
- Motto: Latin: A Minimis Incipe; From The Smallest Beginnings
- Religious affiliation: Roman Catholic
- Established: 1902 (Renamed 1948)
- Founder: Sebastian Cave
- Patron: Chris Patten
- Headmasters: Joe Smith (Senior School); Robert Simmons (Junior School)
- Gender: Co-educational
- Age: 3 to 18
- Enrolment: ~1185
- Houses: Barlow, Gervase, Pickering, Roberts (Senior School) Bede, Fisher, Gregory, More (Junior School)
- Colours: Green, Yellow and Black
- Publication: The Priorian
- Former pupils: Old Priorians
- Tuition Fees - Nursery: Option 1: 8.00am to 1.00pm term time only £4,259 per term Option 2: 8.00am to 3.30pm term time only £6,082 per term Option 3:8.00am to 6.00pm term time only £6,404.00 per term
- Tuition Fees - Junior School: Pre-Prep Department (aged 4 to 7 years) £7,063 per term Junior School (aged 7 to 11 years) £7,850 per term
- Tuition Fees - Senior School and 6th Form: £9,295.00 per term
- Website: http://www.stbenedicts.org.uk

St Benedict's School, usually referred to as St Benedict's, is a British co-educational, independent Catholic day school for pupils aged 3–18 situated in Ealing, West London. A Benedictine school, it accepts and educates pupils of all faiths.

== History ==
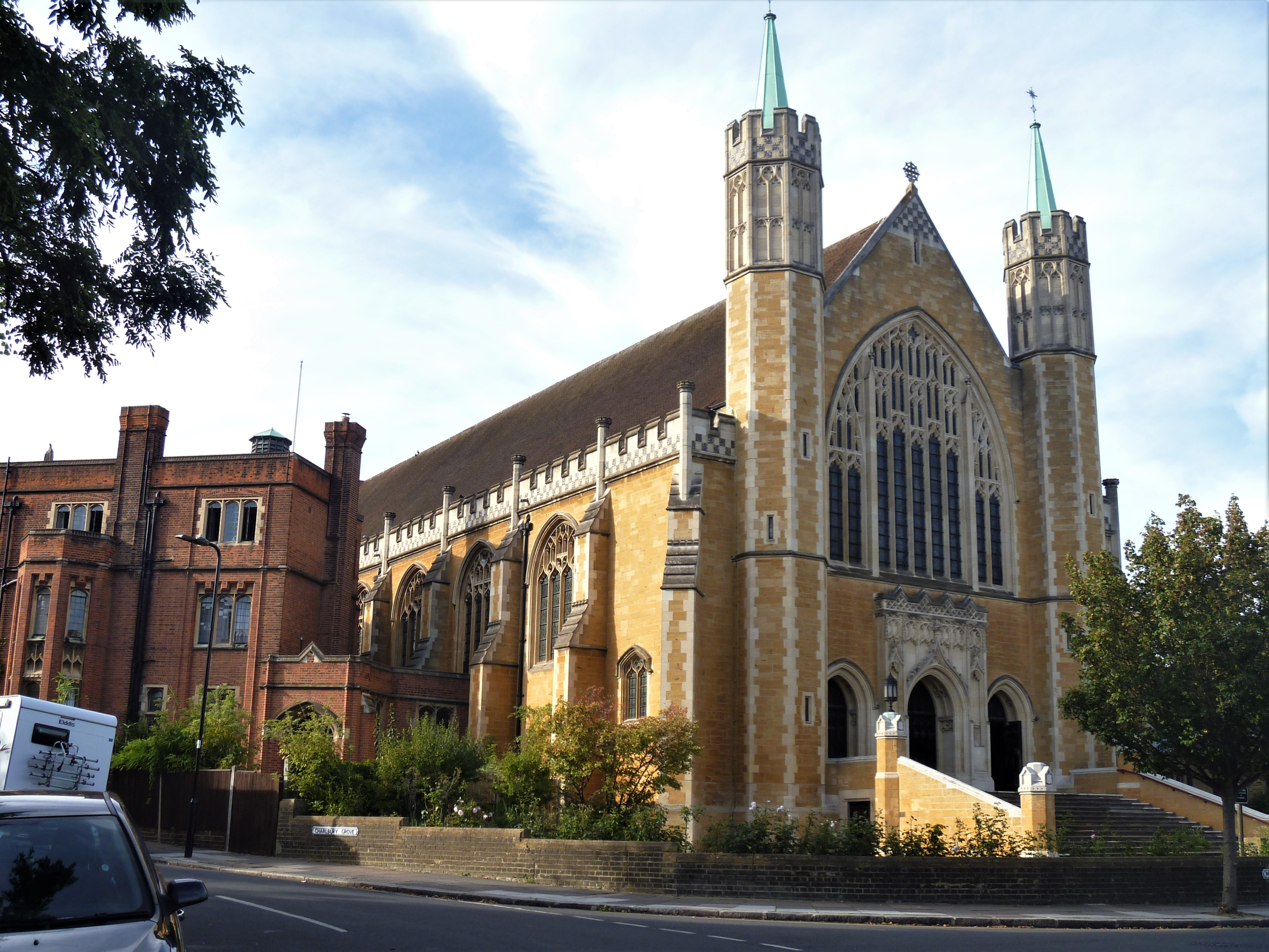
Part of the School and Abbey

=== Foundation ===
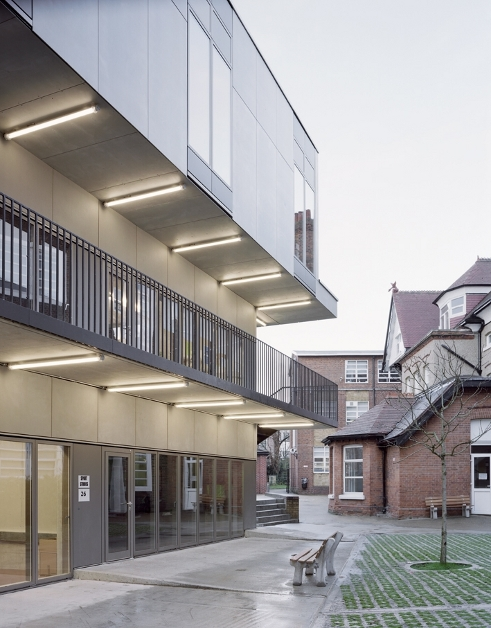
Senior School

St Benedict's School, Ealing was established following the arrival of Benedictine monks from Downside Abbey into Ealing in 1897 to found the first Benedictine Abbey in London since the Reformation. Under the leadership of Sebastian Cave, Ealing Priory School opened on 2 October 1902 with three boys enrolled, following a foundational £5 donation which later featured in the school’s first Priorian magazine. Originally a boys’ school, it was renamed St Benedict’s School in 1948, and ultimately became fully co-educational in 2008.

=== Location ===
The school has occupied various premises at various times in its history, firstly in Blakesley Avenue, then taking rooms in the priory in 1904 before moving across to Orchard Dene (which currently houses the junior school) in Montpelier Avenue. In 1906 15 acres (61,000 m^{2}), about a mile from the main school grounds, in Perivale were purchased to provide a sports ground. By the 1920s Orchard Dene was used for boarders and the school was located in two houses on Eaton Rise. A purpose built school building linking these houses was in use by 1936. During the Second World War pupils were evacuated into the now junior school – boarding ceased – and the abbey church was badly damaged by a bomb on 7 October 1940.

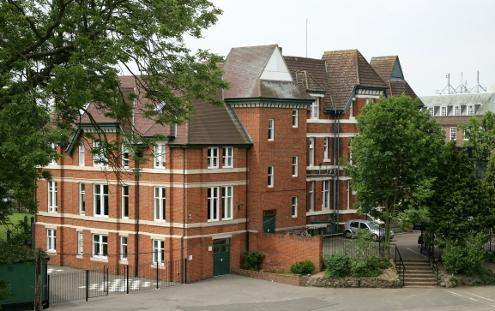
Junior School

=== Sex abuse cases ===
In October 2009, David Pearce, a monk of Ealing Abbey and former headmaster of the junior school, was jailed for eight years, subsequently reduced to five years, for sexual abuse offences at the school in the period from 1972 to 1992 and for one further offence in 2007 after he had ceased to work in the school.

In March 2011, Laurence Soper, the abbot of Ealing Abbey during the 1990s, was arrested on child abuse charges relating to the period when he was a teacher at, and the bursar of, St Benedict's School; it was reported in October 2011 that he had failed to answer bail and was being sought by the police. In 2016, he was arrested in Kosovo and extradited to the UK to face trial. In early December 2017, following a 10-week trial at the Old Bailey in central London, Andrew Soper (as he is now known) was found guilty on 19 counts of child sexual abuse including buggery, indecency with a child and indecent assault. He was sentenced to 18 years imprisonment.

Children suffered severe corporal punishment which was often used as a means to initiate sexual abuse or for sexual gratification. It was claimed that there were daily queues of boys outside the headmaster's study waiting to be caned. A stated that aged 11 he got into trouble in class. The teacher made him kneel in front of the class and continued the whole of the lesson standing on the boy's hands. Jurors at the trial were told about Soper's victims getting sadistic beatings. One survivor said in court, "I have tried countless times to take my own life as I just cannot cope any more."

Following these incidents, and other alleged offences, the Abbot commissioned a report to be prepared by Alex Carlile, Baron Carlile of Berriew with a view to making recommendations on the school's governance. As a result of the changes made the Independent Schools Inspectorate said in its 2013 inspection report that the pastoral care at St Benedict's was excellent.

In October 2011 the Congregation for the Doctrine of the Faith ordered its own enquiry into the same matters, to be conducted by then-Auxiliary Bishop of Westminster John Arnold.

In 2016, Peter Allott, deputy head, and former local Conservative Party councillor who had worked at the school since 2004 was jailed for 33 months for possession of child abuse images, as well as possession of a class A substance. However, it was made clear by the CPS that there was no evidence that Allott had abused his position of trust within the school, and no offensive material was found there.

In 2018–19, the Independent Inquiry into Child Sexual Abuse (IICSA) commissioned by the UK Government was investigating any institutional failures to protect children from sexual abuse within the Roman Catholic Church in England and Wales, and the handling of complaints about Catholic schools and specifically relating to investigations at Ealing Abbey and St Benedict's school. The pope's representative in Britain, archbishop Edward Joseph Adams, refused to co-operate with the inquiry.

The school was described as a "grim and beastly place" by the Independent Inquiry Into Child Sexual Abuse (IICSA), and that "a culture of cover-up and denial of sexual abuse operated at Ealing Abbey." By October 2019, the IICSA had received 18 further allegations against 8 monks and staff, and believed that the true scale of the abuse is "likely to be much higher", than those convicted the report found.

== School life ==
=== Governance ===
Since its foundation members of the monastic community at Ealing Abbey have taught at, and provided pastoral, spiritual and educational leadership, within the school. Until the senior school's first lay headmaster, A.J. Dachs, was appointed in 1987, all headmasters were monks of the abbey. Since 1951 the senior school headmaster has been a member of the Headmasters' and Headmistresses' Conference.

Following the recommendations of the Carlile report (see above) the school, which had been under the trusteeship of the monks of Ealing since its foundation in 1902, became an independent charity in the form of a company limited by guarantee, independent of the Abbey Trust. New governance arrangements, with a lay chairman, came into effect from September 2012.

=== Student representation and the student council ===
The Independent Schools Inspectorate (ISI) recommended the school consider enhancing internal student representation prompting the formation by the school of a school council with its formal powers outlined in its constitution.

Students may run in elections throughout the school, from the third form to the upper fifth with two representatives elected from each year. Sixth form students can run for the offices of student president and chair of the sixth form common room.

The structure of the school council consists of the student president and the student president's chapter. Members are appointed to the chapter by the newly elected student president to represent students in matters regarding food and health, estates and buildings, pastoral and equality, finance and investment, sixth form, upper and middle schools, and the vice president's office. The first codified school council constitution was signed in January 2016 by the student heads of school, student president, school chaplain, headmaster, chair of the sixth form common room, leader of the upper and middle school council and the chair of the school governing body.

=== Ethos ===
The school promotes Catholic Benedictine values through its mission of "Teaching a way of living", based on the Rule of St Benedict. Registration sessions are accompanied by prayer, in which pupils participate and sometimes lead. Mass is celebrated weekly in the school chapel or in the Ealing Abbey, for those staff and pupils who wish to attend. Retreats organized for each year group give time for reflection and for spiritual growth. Trips are organized, for instance to Rome on a study pilgrimage and to Lourdes, where pupils develop their understanding or are able to express their commitment to service.

The Independent Schools Inspectorate noted in its 2013 report that, at all ages, pupils' personal development is excellent. In line with the Benedictine mission, pupils show respect for themselves, for others and for the world around them, in 'learning how to live'. They enjoy relationships with peers and adults alike and their spiritual, moral, social and cultural development is outstanding.

=== Sport ===
The main sports for boys are rugby and cricket and for girls netball and hockey. The school is notably good at fencing, producing national and international fencers. Fencing is a main sport for both boys and girls. The school also offers other sports including dance, tennis, swimming, badminton, basketball, volleyball, cross country running, weight-lifting, athletics and boys' hockey. The school, under new headmaster Joe Smith, introduced football as a main sport for boys and co-curricular girls for the beginning of the 2024/2025 academic year.

In rugby the school was runner-up in the NatWest Schools Cup at under 18 level in 2008; at under 15 level it was winner in 2005 and runner-up in 1993. The school's 1st XV was undefeated in 2008 in 21 of 22 league matches, finishing top of the Canterbury Rankings, and was selected by the Rugby Football Union to represent England in the Sanix World Rugby Youth Invitational Tournament, losing only to the eventual winner. The under 13 side won the 2012 junior champions of the Rosslyn Park National Schools Sevens, the world's largest rugby tournament. The St Benedict’s 1st XV finished 3rd in the 2021 SOCS Daily Mail Schools Trophy – a national competition played under a merit table system by more than 100 teams, going undefeated in the process.

=== Co-curricular activities ===
In the senior school there are over 100 clubs and societies. Pupils run a debating society, staff a Combined Cadet Force and participate in the Duke of Edinburgh Award Scheme, as well as producing art, music and drama. The school further encourages co-curricular activities by offering scholarships in art, drama, music and sport alongside academic scholarships. Every year the school produces and holds art shows, whole school drama productions, music and sport festivals.

== People ==
=== Headmasters ===
- Dom Sebastian Cave (1902–1916)
- Dom Wulstan Pearson (1916–1917)
- Dom Dennis Goolden (1917)
- Dom Roger Huddleston (1917)
- Dom Edward Green (1917–1919)
- Dom Dominic Young (1919–1936)
- Dom Austin Corney (1936–1938)
- Dom Adrian Morey (1938–1939)
- Dom Rupert Hall (1939–1945)
- Dom Bernard Orchard (1945–1960)
- Dom Gerard Hayes (1960)
- Dom George Brown (1961–1965)
- Dom Bernard Orchard (1965–1969)
- Dom George Brown (1969–1978)
- Dom Anthony Gee (1978–1987)
- Tony Dachs (1987–2001)
- Christopher Cleugh (2001–2016)
- Andrew Johnson (2016–2023)
- Joe Smith (2023–present)

=== Notable alumni ===
- Peter Ackroyd, English biographer, novelist and critic, winner of the Somerset Maugham Award and two Whitbread Awards
- Patrick Baty, historian of architectural paint and colour, consultant in the decoration of historic buildings
- David Beaumont, diplomat for the CRO, and the Foreign Office who later served as high commissioner to Botswana
- David Bermingham, member of the NatWest Three, a group of three British businessmen involved in a high-profile court battle against charges of fraud
- Peter Biller, academic specialising in medieval thought, heresy, and medicine, emeritus professor of medieval history at University of York
- Paul Bradley, British-born Irish actor, played Nigel Bates on Eastenders
- Christopher Caudwell, Marxist writer, thinker and poet
- Julian Clary, comedian and novelist
- Vinny Codrington, sports administrator, latterly chief executive of Middlesex County Cricket Club
- David Coleman, professor of demography University of Oxford, and advisory council member at MigrationWatchUK
- Brian Cotter, Baron Cotter, politician, former member of Parliament for Weston-super-Mare
- Dimitri Coutya, MBE, wheelchair fencer who won gold medals in both Épée B and Foil B at 2024 Paris
- Declan Donnellan, stage director, author and film director, founder of Cheek by Jowl international theatre company, multiple Olivier Awards winner, Chevalier de l'Ordre des Arts et des Lettres
- Robin Devenish, retired physicist at the University of Oxford, former dean of Hertford College, Oxford
- Kerry Downes, professor of history of art, specialising in English Baroque architecture
- Ned Eckersley, cricketer
- Laurence Freeman, priest, and director of the World Community for Christian Meditation
- Howard French, newspaper editor who co-ordinated the merger of the Sketch with the Daily Mail, and the launch of the Mail on Sunday
- Reginald C. Fuller, Catholic priest who was appointed canon of Westminster Cathedral by cardinal Cormac Murphy-O'Connor in 2001
- John Gapper, associate editor and chief business commentator of the Financial Times
- Jonathan Glancey, architectural critic and writer who was the architecture and design editor at The Guardian, and previously, at The Independent.
- Sebastian Gorka, former US government official, served under President Donald Trump as Deputy Assistant to the President
- Peter Hennessy, Baron Hennessy of Nympsfield, historian, journalist, and academic specialising in the history of government, Attlee Professor of Contemporary British History at Queen Mary University of London, crossbencher life peer
- Jonah Holmes, Welsh international rugby union player
- John Hooper, journalist, author and broadcaster, currently Italy correspondent of The Economist and a contributing editor of The Guardian
- Damian Hopley, England international rugby union player, Melrose Cup winner, founder and chief executive of the not-for-profit registered trade union Rugby Players' Association (RPA)
- Dominic Inglot, professional tennis player, current British no. 2 in doubles
- David Luckham, emeritus professor of electrical engineering at Stanford University
- George Loffhagen, professional tennis player
- Peter Linehan, scholar of medieval Iberia, fellow, tutor, and dean of St John's College, Cambridge
- Colin MacCabe, academic, writer and film producer
- Angela McHale, actress and comedian, known for her variety of British television roles including roles in Not Going Out, The Catherine Tate Show and Grange Hill.
- Duncan McNair, commercial and corporate litigation lawyer, author and charity campaigner
- Tony McWalter, politician, former MP for Hemel Hempstead
- Denis MacShane, politician jailed in the UK Parliamentary expenses scandal, Minister of State for Europe in the Labour Government from 2002 until 2005; Member of Parliament for Rotherham from 1994 to 2012
- Oriane Messina, comedy writer and performer
- Douglas Murray, journalist, associate director of the Henry Jackson Society, associate editor of The Spectator, who appears regularly in the British broadcast media
- Dom Gregory Murray OSB. Composer, organist, liturgist.
- Denis O'Regan, rock photographer whose imagery is particularly associated with the punk movement, Queen, David Bowie, and Duran Duran
- Bernard Orchard, Catholic Benedictine monk, and biblical scholar who would later return as headmaster of the school
- Chris Patten, Baron Patten of Barnes, former cabinet minister, chairman of the Conservative Party, European commissioner, British governor of Hong Kong, chairman of the Independent Commission on Policing for Northern Ireland, and governor of the BBC Trust, chancellor of the University of Oxford
- Gary Prado Salmón, Bolivian military officer, government minister, diplomat and ambassador, who was head of the special forces unit which captured Marxist revolutionary Che Guevara in 1967
- Ben Ryan, rugby union coach who coached the Fiji sevens to two Sevens World Series titles, and a gold medal in sevens rugby at the 2016 Rio Olympics
- John Sauven, economist, and executive director of Greenpeace UK since 2008
- Andy Serkis, film actor known for his roles in prominent films such The Lord of the Rings trilogy, The Hobbit: An Unexpected Journey, Star Wars: The Force Awakens, Star Wars: The Last Jedi and Planet of the Apes
- Labi Siffre, singer, songwriter, musician and poet
- Joe Simpson, England international rugby union player
- James Smythe, novelist and screenwriter
- Iain Softley, film director, producer and screenwriter, whose best-known films include Hackers and K-PAX.
- Alexander Stafford, Conservative Member of Parliament for Rother Valley.
- Greg Stafford (politician), Conservative Member of Parliament for Farnham and Bordon
- Billy Withall, British Army officer
- John Zylinski, Polish prince
