= A Christian Reflection on the New Age =

Document of the Congregation for the Doctrine of the Faith

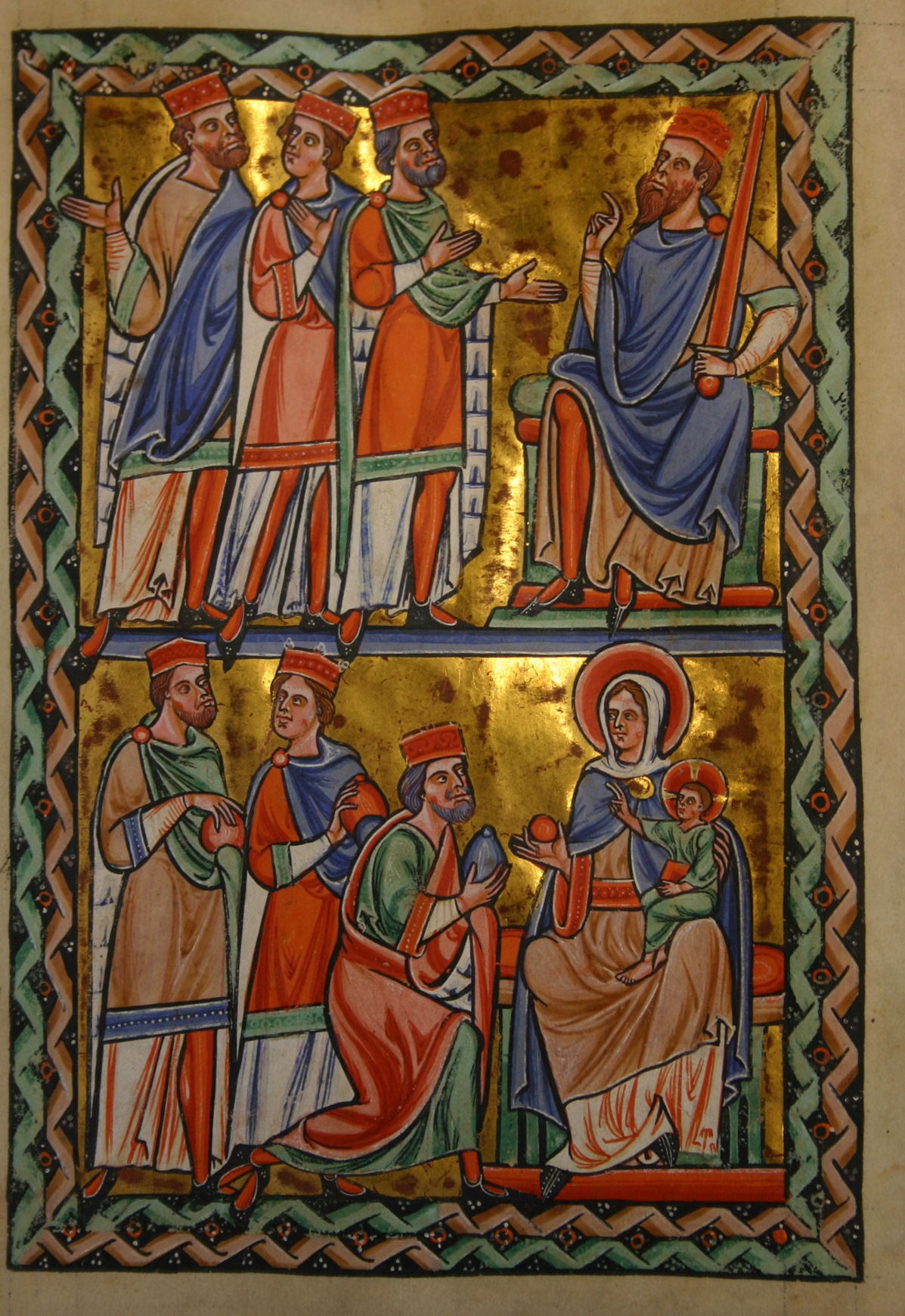
The document compares the choice between Christ vs the New Age to the choice the three wise men from the East made between Child Jesus vs King Herod, shown here from the 13th century Psalter of St. Louis.

A Christian Reflection on the New Age refers to a six-year study by the Roman Catholic Church on the New Age movement. The study, published in 2003, is highly critical of the New Age movement and follows the 1989 document Aspects of Christian meditation, in which the Vatican warned Catholics against mixing Christian meditation with Eastern approaches to spirituality.

The document's title is Jesus Christ, the bearer of the Water of Life. The document discusses the encounter between Jesus and the Samaritan woman at the well, which it characterizes as "a paradigm for our engagement with truth".

The document considers the New Age based on "weak thought" and emphasizes the differences between Catholic thought and the New Age. According to the review of the document in The Tablet, "there is never any doubt in the document that New Age is incompatible with and hostile to the core beliefs of Christianity."

Expressing general agreement with the views expressed by the document, Richard Land, president of the Ethics and Religious Liberty Commission of the Southern Baptist Convention, said that there would be widespread agreement among Baptists that New Age ideas are contrary to Christian tradition and doctrine.

== Background and overview ==
The document was prepared in response to the need expressed by Catholic bishops to have a clear directive about where New Age practices stand with respect to Roman Catholic doctrine. In response to the requests, the document addresses and provides Christian guidance on New Age phenomena that involve yoga, meditation, feng shui and crystal healing and was published in 2003 as a 90-page booklet titled A Christian reflection on the New Age.

The document was presented at a February 2003 Vatican conference on A Christian Reflection on the New Age. Monsignor Michael Fitzgerald stated at the conference that the "Church avoids any concept that is close to those of the New Age". Cardinal Paul Poupard, head of the Pontifical Council for Culture, said that the "New Age is a misleading answer to the oldest hopes of man." Poupard, the Vatican's minister of culture, also warned that the New Age was based on "weak thinking".

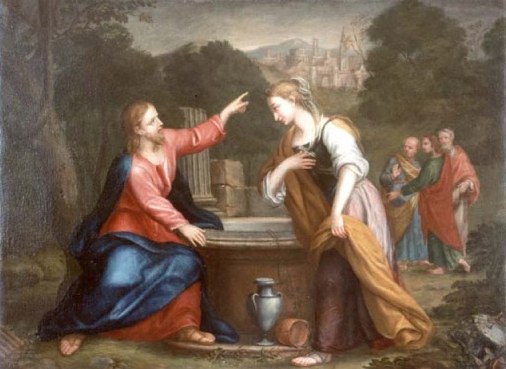
The Water of Life Discourse between Jesus and the Samaritan woman at the well, by Giacomo Franceschini, 17-18th century

The document presents a highly critical view of the New Age movement and considers it as incompatible with and hostile to the core beliefs of Christianity. The document states that upon close examination it becomes clear that there is little in the New Age that is new, and that for Christians, the "New Age began 2000 years ago, with Christ". The document also criticizes the New Age movement, stating it is attempting to blur the distinction between good and evil.

By posing the question: Christ or Aquarius? the document states that the New Age often suggests an alternative vision of reality or an alternative way of improving one's current situation by magic. The document criticizes the view that the Age of Aquarius will replace the Christian Age. Referring to the Gospel of Luke (16:13) that "No servant can be the slave of two masters", it states that Christians have only to think of the difference between the wise men from the East and King Herod to recognize the powerful effects of choice for or against Christ.

The Jesuit magazine America commented that the Vatican directive was relevant to Catholic women in religious institutes because there are clear differences between Catholic teachings and the New Age that can become blurred within spiritual practices.

The document was also discussed at June 2004 Vatican conference attended by representatives of the episcopal conferences of 22 countries, as well as members of the Roman Curia. Following the conference, Alessandro Pennesi, a professor at the Pontifical Lateran University reiterated the Vatican warnings and stated that he agreed with the sentiment that the New Age is based on "ethical relativism" and that it is not possible to "isolate some elements of New Age religiosity as acceptable to Christians, while rejecting others."

== Structure and content ==
The document has 6 main sections, as well as an appendix, and glossary of New Age terms. The main sections are:

1. What sort of reflection. This section discusses the context and timing of the document. It states that the Third Millennium, two thousand years after the birth of Christ, is a time when astrologers believe that the Age of Pisces is drawing to a close. Hence a time when the public is bombarded with the New Age message may be the right moment to offer an assessment of why it is not consistent with the Christian message.

2. New Age spirituality: an overview. This section provides an overview of the New Age Movement and its history. Referring to Harmony and Good Vibrations, it criticizes the approach of being in tune with nature or the cosmos, claiming that it blurs the distinction between good and evil and creates the mindset that "we cannot condemn anyone, and nobody needs forgiveness".

Golden living: The document claims that New Age practices can be associated with other practices, listing acupuncture, biofeedback, kinesiology, homeopathy, iridology and various kinds of bodywork, polarity massage, meditation and visualisation, psychic healing, healing by crystals, metals, music or colors, and twelve-step programs.

Wholeness and dualism: The document states that the New Age encourages that we should overcome dualisms, such as Creator and creation, the distinction between man and nature, or spirit and matter.

Central themes of the New Age. The document claims that the New Age is not a religion, but is interested in what is called “divine”. Some common points in the New Age movement are:

- The cosmos is seen as an organic whole, animated by an energy, soul or spirit
- Credence is given to the mediation of various spiritual entities
- Humans are assumed capable of ascending to invisible higher spheres
- A "perennial knowledge" pre-dates and is superior to all religions and cultures
- People are encouraged to follow enlightened masters.

3. New Age and Christian faith. The document states that for Christians, the spiritual life is a relationship with God. It criticizes Eastern meditation and states that all meditation techniques need to be purged of presumption and pretentiousness. It states that Christian prayer is not an exercise in self-contemplation, stillness and self-emptying, but a dialogue of love, one which "implies an attitude of conversion, a flight from 'self' to the 'you' of God".

4. New Age and Christian faith in contrast. This section criticizes several elements of the New Age practices. For instance, it claims that New Age practices are not really prayer.

5. Jesus Christ offers us the water of life. The document re-iterates that the Church's one foundation is Jesus Christ, who is at the heart of every Christian action, and every Christian message. It refers to the Gospel of John's account of the Samaritan Woman at the Well as "a paradigm for our engagement with truth".

6. Points to note. This section mentions several items, also stressing the need for pastoral guidance against the New Age movement.

== New Age places ==
The document identifies three allegedly key 'New Age' initiatives that it finds objectionable: Esalen Institute in California, the Findhorn Foundation in Scotland and Monte Verità in Switzerland. It also mentions the Open Center and the Omega Institute in New York.

The document states that the yearbooks at Monte Verità make it clear that there is an intention to create an "integrated world religion", and that it is fascinating to see the list of people who have gathered over the years at Monte Verità.

== See also ==
- Aspects of Christian meditation
- Rosary devotions and spirituality
- Sacred Congregation for Divine Worship
- Doreen Virtue
