= John Main =

Priest and monk

- Main in his Benedictine monastic habit
- Born: Douglas William Victor Main; 21 January 1926; London, England
- Died: 30 December 1982 (aged 56); Montreal, Quebec, Canada

John Douglas Main OSB (born Douglas William Victor Main; 21 January 1926 – 30 December 1982) was an English Roman Catholic priest and Benedictine monk who taught a form of Christian meditation which uses a prayer-phrase or mantra. In 1975, Main began Christian meditation groups which met at Ealing Abbey, his monastery in West London, England, and, later, in Montreal, Quebec, Canada. These were the origins of the ecumenical network of Christian meditation groups which have become the World Community for Christian Meditation (WCCM).

== Life ==
John Main was born in London as Douglas Main, the fourth of six children of David and Eileen Main. In the 1940s he joined the Canons Regular of the Lateran and studied at the diocesan seminary of St Edmund's College, Ware, in England before being chosen to pursue theology studies at the Pontifical Athenaeum Angelicum, Rome. He began to doubt his vocation to the priesthood and decided to leave his order to go to Dublin (where his family then lived), where he studied law at Trinity College. He graduated in 1954 and joined the British Colonial Service, working as a civil servant.

Main was assigned to Kuala Lumpur in Malaya, where he met Swami Satyananda (1909-1961) who taught him meditation using a mantra as the means to arrive at meditative stillness. The swami taught Main to meditate by giving him a Christian mantra. Main through his own work understood that mantras were also an ancient Christian tradition. The mantra he recommended was "maranatha", an ancient Aramaic phrase meaning "Come Lord".

In 1956, Main returned to Dublin and taught law at Trinity College. In 1959 he decided to join the Benedictines at Ealing Abbey in London. He took the name of John, in honour of St John the Apostle. He was ordained a priest in 1963. Following his ordination he taught at St Benedict's School, Ealing, which is governed by the monastic community of Ealing Abbey.

In 1970, Main was appointed the headmaster of St. Anselm's Abbey School in Washington, D.C., where he began to study seriously the writings of the desert father John Cassian for the first time. Main saw parallels between the spiritual practice taught by Cassian and the meditative practice he had been taught by the swami in Kuala Lumpur.

In 1974, Main left Saint Anselm's Abbey in Washington and returned to Ealing Abbey where he began Christian meditation groups at an old house on the monastery grounds. He was assisted in this work by Laurence Freeman, also a monk of Ealing Abbey. In 1977, Main and Freeman were sent to establish a new Benedictine monastery in Montreal, Quebec. There too, they taught Christian meditation groups.

Main died of cancer at the Benedictine monastery in Montreal in 1982 and is buried at Mount Saviour Monastery, Elmira, New York. He was succeeded by Laurence Freeman.

Freeman continued Main's work, travelling widely to establish Christian meditation groups across the world. In 1991, these groups were networked into the World Community for Christian Meditation (WCCM). Each year the WCCM hosts the John Main Seminar, which has been led by Mary McAleese, Huston Smith, Charles Taylor, Father William Johnston, Father Richard Rohr OFM, Sister Joan Chittister OSB, Anglican archbishop Rowan Williams, Greek Orthodox bishop Kallistos Ware, Abbot Thomas Keating, Dom Bede Griffiths and the 14th Dalai Lama, among others.

== Books ==
- Word into Silence (1980)
- Moment of Christ: The Path of Meditation (2000)
- Essential Writings
- Door to silence, An Anthology for Meditation
- The Way of Unknowing: Expanding Spiritual Horizons Through Meditation
- Silence and Stillness in Every Season: Daily Readings with John Main
