= Aspects of Christian meditation =

1989 document on Catholic doctrine

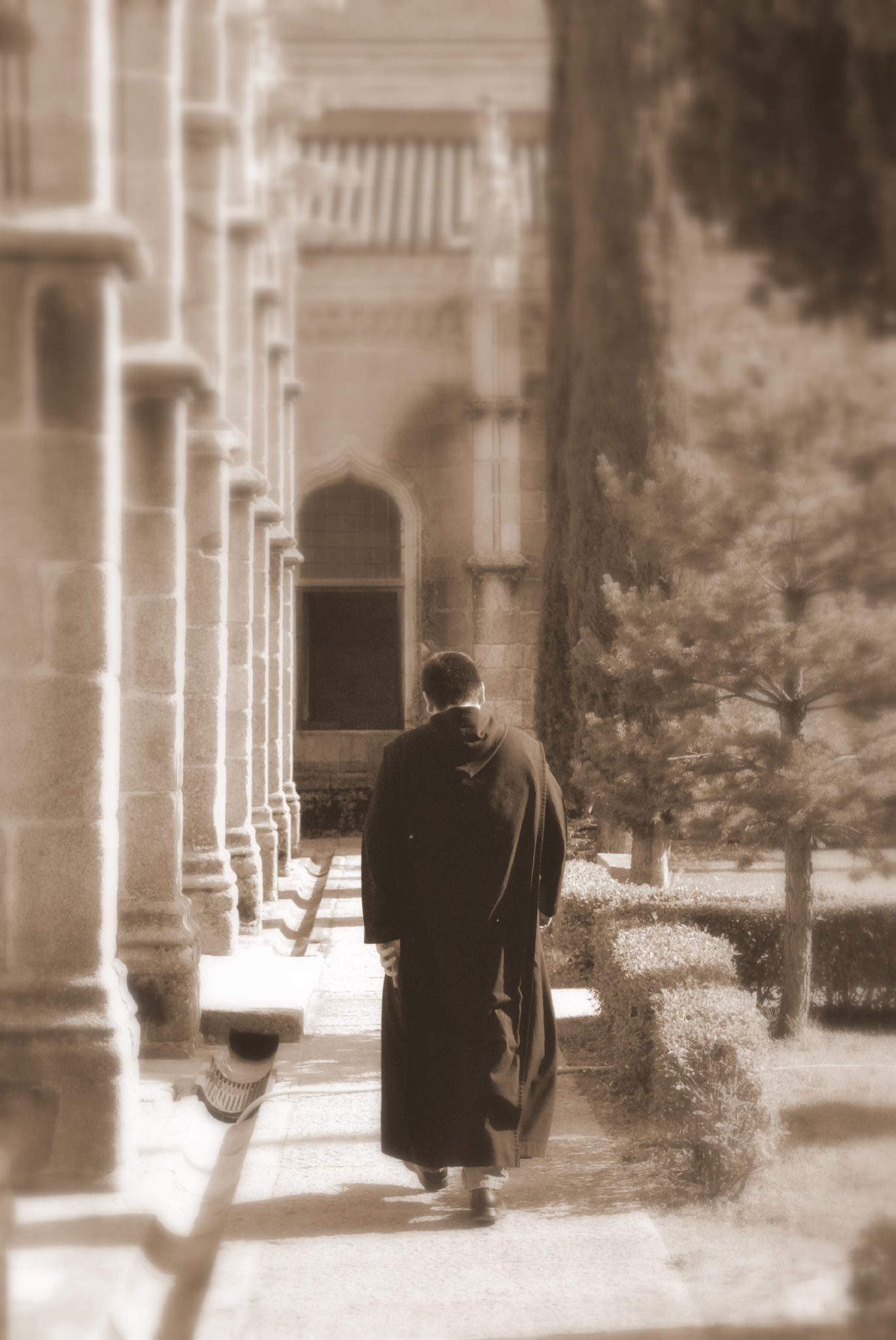
A monk walking in a Benedictine monastery.

Aspects of Christian meditation was the topic of a 15 October 1989 document of the Congregation for the Doctrine of the Faith. The document is titled "Letter to the Bishops of the Catholic Church on some aspects of Christian meditation" and is formally known by its incipit, Orationis formas.

The document issues warnings on differences, and potential incompatibilities, between Christian meditation and the styles of meditation used in eastern religions such as Buddhism. The document warns of fundamental errors in combining Christian and non-Christian styles of meditation.

Referring to the constitution Dei verbum the document emphasizes that all Christian prayer and meditation should "proceed to converge on Christ" and be guided by the gift of the Holy Spirit. It reaffirmed that the Church recommends the reading of the Scripture prior to and as a source of Christian prayer and meditation.

Similar warnings were issued in 2003 in A Christian reflection on the New Age which characterized New Age activities as essentially incompatible with Christian teachings and values.

== Warnings ==
This document of the Congregation for the Doctrine of the Faith stresses the differences between Christian and eastern meditative approaches. It warns of the dangers of attempting to mix Christian meditation with eastern approaches since that could be both confusing and misleading, and may result in the loss of the essential Christocentric nature of Christian meditation.

The letter warns that "euphoric states" obtained through Eastern meditation should not be confused with prayer or assumed to be signs of the presence of God, a state that should always result in loving service to others. Without these truths, the letter said, meditation, which should be a flight from the self, can degenerate into a form of self-absorption. The letter warns against concentration on the self, rather than on Christ, and states that:

Christian prayer, ..., the communion of redeemed creatures with the intimate life of the Persons of the Trinity, based on Baptism and the Eucharist, source and summit of the life of the Church, implies an attitude of conversion, a flight from "self" to the "You" of God. Thus Christian prayer is at the same time always authentically personal and communitarian. It flees from impersonal techniques or from concentrating on oneself, which can create a kind of rut.

The letter also warns that concentration on the physical aspects of meditation "can degenerate into a cult of the body" and that equating bodily states with mysticism "could also lead to psychic disturbance and, at times, to moral deviations."

== Structure ==
The document has seven sections:

1. Introduction: discusses the fact that many Christians wish to experience a deeper and authentic prayer life despite the speed of modern culture, and that some have come to see eastern meditation as a possible solution. But it indicates that Christian meditation is different.
2. Christian Prayer In The Light Of Revelation: Traces the origins of Christian meditation and its roots in the Bible.
3. Erroneous Ways Of Praying: Warns of errors in specific approaches to prayer.
4. The Christian Way To Union With God: Discusses the prominent features of the "way of Christ" as a key to Christian prayer.
5. Questions Of Method: Emphasizes that it is impossible to arrive at a perfect love of God if one "ignores his giving of himself to us through his Incarnate Son".
6. Psychological-Corporal Methods: Discusses the "position and demeanor of the body" and "psychophysical symbolism".
7. "I Am The Way": Emphasizes that each person should not be led so much by his personal tastes as by the Holy Spirit, who guides him, through Christ, to the Father.

== Papal references ==
Pope John Paul II later referred to the document in addresses at a general audience in 1999 and to a particular group in 2003, using it as an example of how Christians need to focus their prayers. He referred to it also when saying, in the letter with which he marked the closing of the Great Jubilee of the Year 2000, that, by opening our heart to the love of God, prayer also opens it to the love of our brothers and sisters, and makes us capable of shaping history according to God's plan.

== Related announcements ==
In 2003, the Vatican issued further warnings regarding New Age practices including meditation. Monsignor Michael Fitzgerald stated at the Vatican conference on A Christian Reflection on the New Age that the "Church avoids any concept that is close to those of the New Age". Cardinal Paul Poupard, head of the Pontifical Council for Culture, said that the "New Age is a misleading answer to the oldest hopes of man". According to the review of the document in The Tablet "there is never any doubt in the document that New Age is incompatible with and hostile to the core beliefs of Christianity".

== See also ==
- A Christian reflection on the New Age
- Christian Meditation
- Rosary devotions and spirituality
- Sacred Congregation for Divine Worship
