= Edward Cuthbert Butler =

English Benedictine monk and historian

The Right Reverend Dom Edward Cuthbert Butler OSB
- Abbot of Downside
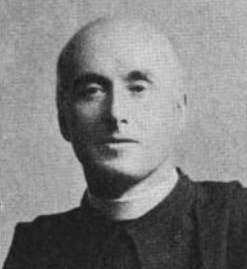
- Butler in 1917
- Church: Catholic Church
- Installed: 1906
- Term ended: 1922
- Predecessor: Edward Ford
- Successor: Leander Ramsay

Orders
- Ordination: 1884

Personal details
- Born: 6 May 1858 Dublin, United Kingdom
- Died: 2 April 1934 (aged 75) Ealing Priory, London, United Kingdom
- Denomination: Catholic
- Education: Downside School

Cuthbert Butler OSB (born Edward Joseph Aloysius Butler; 6 May 1858 – 2 April 1934) was an Irish ecclesiastical historian much of whose career was spent as Benedictine of Downside Abbey in England. He was sometimes referred to as Dom Cuthbert Butler.

Butler is known for The Vatican Council: The Story from Inside in Bishop Ullathorne's Letters. Described by Michael J. G. Pahls as "[t]he standard [English-language] account of the First Vatican Council", the book is based on the correspondence of Bishop William Bernard Ullathorne of Birmingham. Gertrude Himmelfarb describes The Vatican Council as designed to support papal infallibility.

He also wrote on mysticism.

== Early life ==
Edward Joseph Aloysius Butler was born on 6 May 1858 in Dublin, Ireland, to Edward Butler (1812-1902) and Mary (Cruise) Butler. His father was the first professor of mathematics at the Catholic University of Ireland, from 1854 to 1859, before and after that having worked for the Commission of National Education in Ireland. His mother came from a Norman Irish Catholic family and was a sister of the eminent consulting physician Sir Francis Cruise.

Butler was educated at Downside School, an English Benedictine school, from 1869 to 1875. During his time at the school, he was greatly influenced by the Benedictine priest William Petre who, along with the prior, Bernard Murphy, advised him as he discerned his vocation. As his parents did not want him to enter the Benedictine noviciate immediately after finishing at Downside, he spent a brief period at the short-lived Catholic University College in Kensington, London, as well as travelling throughout Europe.

== Monastic life ==
Butler entered the noviciate at Belmont Abbey in Herefordshire in 1876. Reflecting on his entry into the abbey in a manuscript written between 1891 and 1892, he wrote:

I went to Belmont towards the end of August, 1876, being just past 18. I had no notion whatever, not even the most rudimentary, of the nature of the religious state or the monastic life. I acted on a perfectly blind impulse; I felt a strong call to be a monk, but I had no clear idea of what was meant by being a monk ... I had no great attraction for church services or prayer; I was not drawn by affection for any of the monks; I was not flying from the dangers of the world – I knew nothing of them ... I entered the noviciate, my mind, as has been said, a perfect blank as to the mode of life I was embarking on. I remember shortly after my entrance saying to an old school friend among the juniors that I should not have been surprised at anything I found at Belmont – not even at perpetual abstinence or silence, or midnight office.

He was ordained in 1884, the same year he got an MA from the University of London, under his birth name, and then became headmaster at Downside School. In 1896 he moved to Cambridge, and soon thereafter he founded Benet House there for Benedictines attending that university. He was a student at Christ's College, Cambridge, now using the name Edward Cuthbert Butler, and was awarded BA 1898 and MA 1903. In 1906 he was elected Abbot of Downside Abbey, a post he held until his resignation in 1922.

He spent the rest of his life preaching in London and writing the books for which he is now remembered, in particular Western Mysticism (1922) and The Vatican Council (1930). He had earlier contributed dozens of articles to the 11th edition of the Encyclopedia Britannica (1911).

He died at his home in London on 2 April 1934.

== Published works ==
- The Lausiac History of Palladius. Texts and Studies: Contributions to Biblical and Patristic Literature. Vol. 6. 1898. LCCN 25012303.
- The Text of St. Benedict's Rule. 1899.
- Benedictine Monachism: Studies in Benedictine Life and Rule. London: Longmans, Green and Co. 1919. LCCN 20002500.
- Western Mysticism: The Teaching of SS Augustine Gregory and Bernard on Contemplation and the Contemplative Life. London: Constable & Co. 1922. LCCN 23007246. OCLC 3181182.
- Benedictine Monachism: Studies in Benedictine Life and Rule (2nd ed.). London: Longmans, Green and Co. 1924.
- The Life & Times of Bishop Ullathorne, 1806–1889. London: Burns, Oates, and Washbourne. 1926. LCCN 26014362. OCLC 4231977.
- Religions of Authority and the Religion of the Spirit: With Other Essays, Apologetical and Critical. London: Sheed and Ward. 1930. OCLC 5684267.
- The Vatican Council: The Story from Inside in Bishop Ullathorne's Letters. London: Longmans, Green and Co. 1930. LCCN 30022961. OCLC 3393424.
- Ways of Christian Life: Old Spirituality for Modern Men. London: Sheed and Ward. 1932. LCCN 32022686. OCLC 3553103.
