= World Community for Christian Meditation =

Christian meditation organization

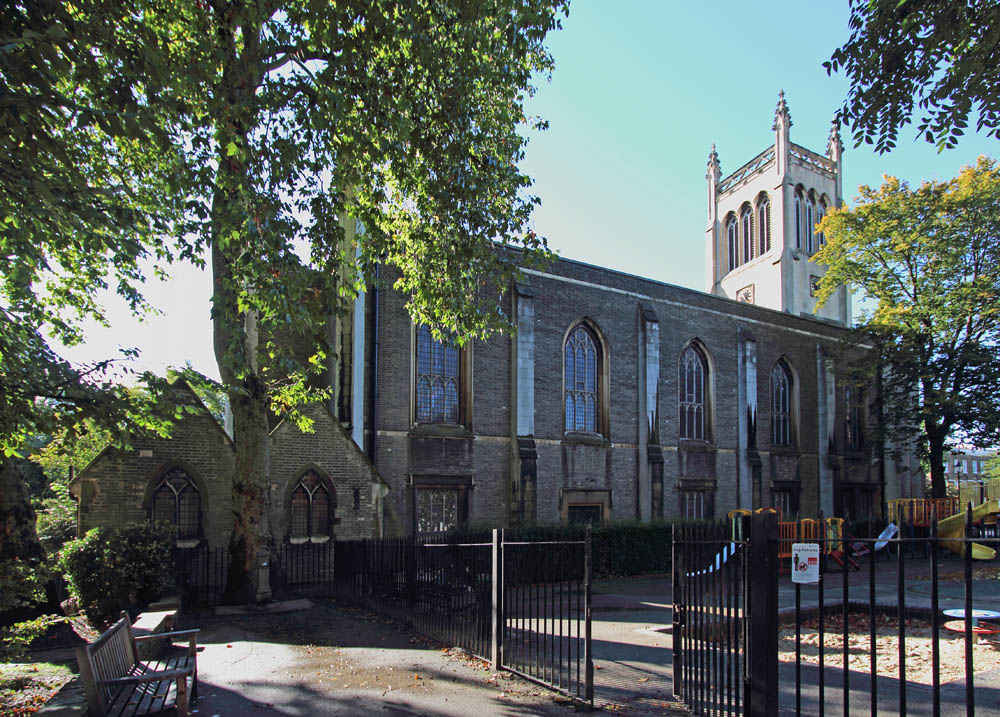
- WCCM headquarters at St Mark's Church
- Abbreviation: WCCM
- Formation: 1991
- Registration no.: 1182213
- Legal status: Charity
- Headquarters: St Mark's Church, Myddelton Square, London EC1R 1XX
- Director: Laurence Freeman, OSB
- Website: https://www.wccm.org/

The World Community for Christian Meditation (WCCM) is a registered charity founded in 1991 that promotes a form of Christian meditation developed by Benedictine monk and priest John Main, OSB.

The current director of the WCCM is Fr. Laurence Freeman, OSB, a student of John Main and a Benedictine monk of the Olivetan Congregation. Main taught a way of meditation that was based on the parallels he saw between the spiritual practice taught by Desert Father John Cassian and the meditative practice he had been taught in Kuala Lumpur.

The London-based organization has 110,000 members in over 100 countries as of 2014. The WCCM runs the annual John Main Seminar, which has in the past featured speakers such as the 14th Dalai Lama. In 2005, the John Main Center for Meditation and Interreligious Dialogue was established at Georgetown University in collaboration with the WCCM. The WCCM is presently renovating the former Cistercian abbey of Bonnevaux located in Marçay, France, which the organization purchased in 2017.

== See also ==
- Canadian Christian Meditation Community
- Christian contemplation
