= Christian meditation =

Form of prayer

Christian meditation is a form of prayer in which a structured attempt is made to become aware of and reflect upon the revelations of God. The word meditation comes from the Latin word meditārī, which has a range of meanings including to reflect on, to study, and to practice. Christian meditation is the process of deliberately focusing on specific thoughts (such as a Bible passage) and reflecting on their meaning in the context of the love of God.

Christian meditation aims to heighten the personal relationship based on the love of God that marks Christian communion. Both in Eastern and Western Christianity meditation is the middle level in a broad three-stage characterization of prayer: it involves more reflection than first level vocal prayer, but is more structured than the multiple layers of contemplative prayer. Teachings in both the Eastern and Western Christian churches have emphasized the use of Christian meditation as an element in increasing one's knowledge of Christ.

== Context and structure ==
Christian meditation involves looking back on Jesus' life, thanksgiving and adoration of God for his action in sending Jesus for human salvation. In her book The Interior Castle (Mansions 6, Chapter 7) Saint Teresa of Avila defined Christian meditation as follows:

By meditation I mean prolonged reasoning with the understanding, in this way. We begin by thinking of the favor which God bestowed upon us by giving us His only Son; and we do not stop there but proceed to consider the mysteries of His whole glorious life.

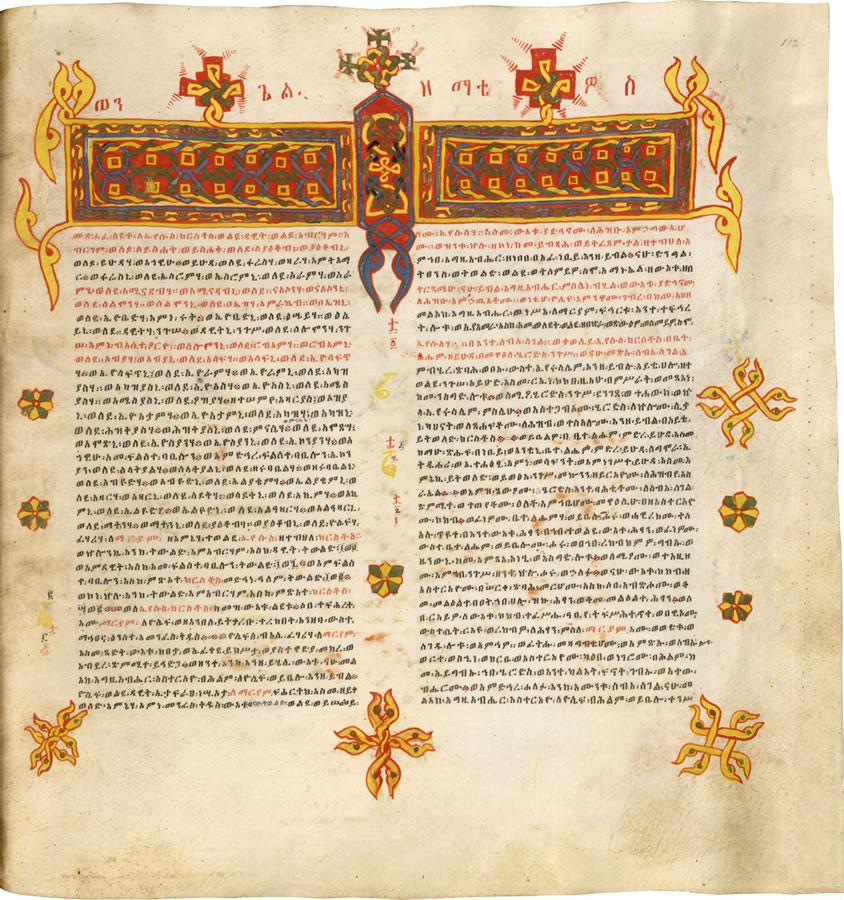
Gospel of Matthew, c. 1700

Quoting the Gospel of Matthew: "No one knows the Father but only the Son and anyone whom the Son wants to reveal him" and I Corinthians: "But we have received the Spirit who is from God so that we may realize what God has freely given us", theologian Hans von Balthasar explained the context of Christian meditation as follows:

The dimensions of Christian meditation develop from God's having completed his self-revelation in two directions: Speaking out of his own, and speaking as a man, through his Son, disclosing the depths of man.... And this meditation can take place only where the revealing man, God's Son, Jesus Christ, reveals God as his Father: in the Holy Spirit of God, so we may join in probing God's depths, which only God's Spirit probes.

Building on that theme, E. P. Clowney explained that three dimensions of Christian meditation are crucial, not merely for showing its distinctiveness, but for guiding its practice. The first is that Christian meditation is grounded in the Bible. Because the God of the Bible is a personal God who speaks in words of revelation, Christian meditation responds to this revelation and focuses on that aspect, in contrast to mystic meditations which use mantras. The second distinctive mark of Christian meditation is that it responds to the love of God, as in I John: "We love, for he first loved us". The personal relationship based on the love of God that marks Christian communion is thus heightened in Christian meditation. The third dimension is that the revelations of the Bible and the love of God lead to the worship of God: making Christian meditation an exercise in praise.

Thomas Merton characterized the goal of Christian meditation as follows: "The true end of Christian meditation is practically the same as the end of liturgical prayer and the reception of the sacraments: a deeper union by grace and charity with the Incarnate Word, who is the only Mediator between God and man, Jesus Christ." While Protestants view salvation in terms of faith and grace alone (i.e. sola fide and sola gratia) both Western and Eastern Catholic Christians see a role for meditation on the path to salvation and redemption. Apostle Paul stated in Epistle to the Romans that salvation only comes from "God that hath mercy". The path to salvation in Christian meditation is not one of give and take, and the aim of meditation is to bring joy to the heart of God. The Word of God directs meditations to show the two aspects of love that please God: obedience and adoration. The initiative in Christian salvation is with God, and one does not meditate or love God to gain his favor.

=== Holy Spirit's role ===
In Western Christian teachings, meditation is usually believed to involve the inherent action of the Holy Spirit to help the meditating Christian understand the deeper meanings of the Word of God. In the 12th century, decades before Guigo II's the Ladder of the Monk, one of his predecessors, Guigo I, emphasized this belief by stating that when earnest meditation begins, the Holy Spirit enters the soul of the meditator, "turns water into wine" and shows the path toward contemplation and a better understanding of God.

In the 19th century, Charles Spurgeon affirmed this belief within the Protestant tradition and wrote: "The Spirit has taught us in meditation to ponder its message, to put aside, if we will, the responsibility of preparing the message we've got to give. Just trust God for that." In the 20th century, Hans Urs von Balthasar paraphrased this teaching as follows:

The vistas of God's Word unfold to the meditating Christian solely through the gift of the Divine Spirit. How could we understand what is within God and is disclosed to us except through the Spirit of God who is communicated to us?

As a biblical basis for this teaching, von Balthasar referred to 1 Corinthians 2:9-10: "these are the things God has revealed to us by his Spirit. The Spirit searches all things, even the deep things of God."

=== Distinction from non-Christian meditation ===
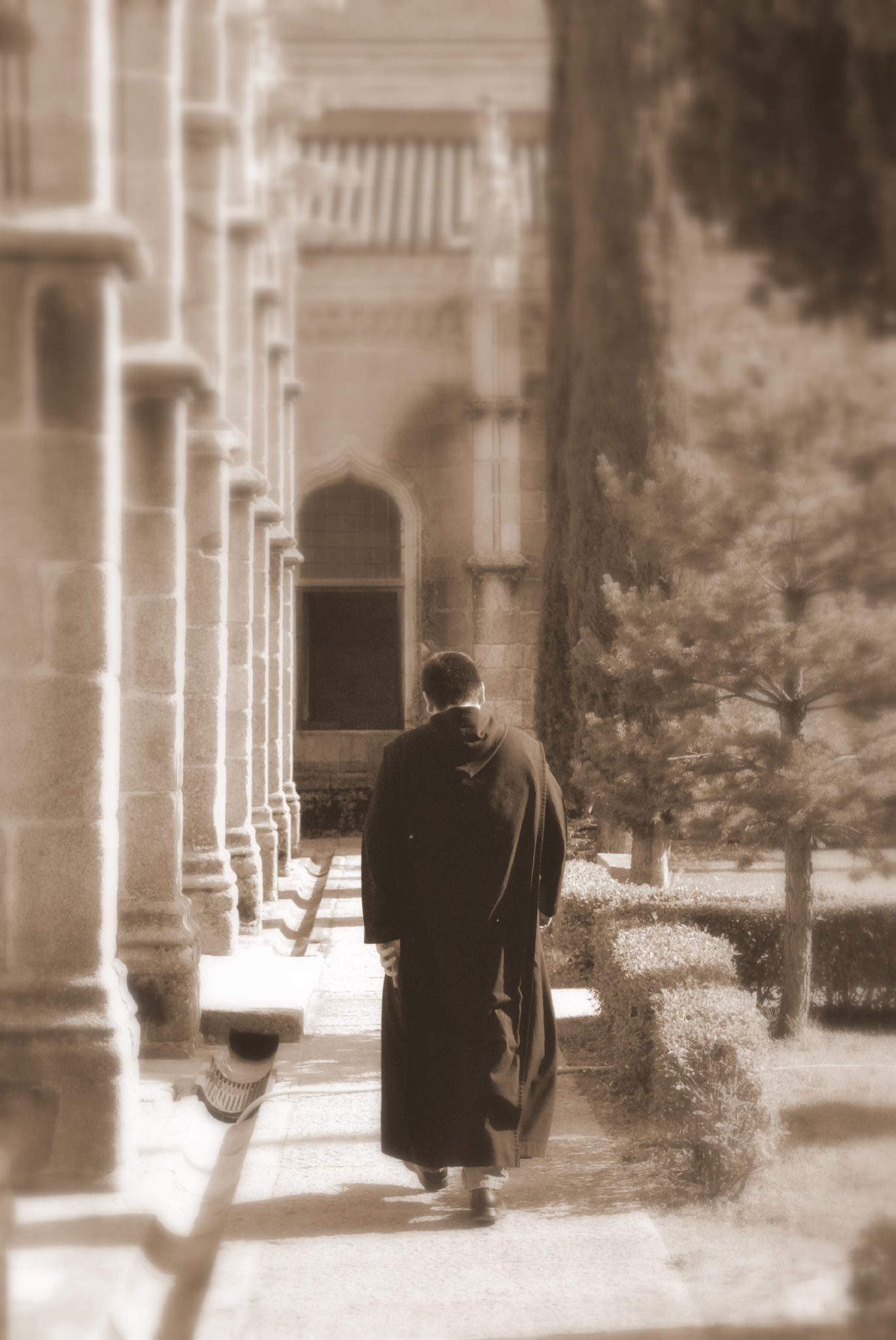
A monk walking in a Benedictine monastery

Christian meditation is generally held to be distinct from the styles of meditations performed in Eastern religions (such as Buddhism) or in the context of the New Age. While other types of meditation may suggest approaches to disengage the mind, Christian meditation aims to fill the mind with thoughts related to biblical passages or Christian devotions. Although some mystics in both the Western and Eastern churches have associated feelings of ecstasy with meditation (e.g. St. Teresa of Avila's legendary meditative ecstasy), St. Gregory of Sinai, one of the originators of Hesychasm, stated that the goal of Christian meditation is "seeking guidance from the Holy Spirit, beyond the minor phenomenon of ecstasy".

Modern Christian teachings on meditation at times include specific criticism of the Transcendental Meditation technique, e.g. John Bertram Phillips stated that Christian meditation involves the action of the Holy Spirit on biblical passages and warned of approaches that "disengage the mind" from scripture. According to Edmund P. Clowney, Christian meditation contrasts with cosmic styles of oriental meditation as radically as the portrayal of God the Father in the Bible contrasts with discussions of Krishna or Brahman in Indian teachings. Unlike eastern meditations, most styles of Christian meditations are intended to stimulate thought and deepen meaning. Christian meditation aims to heighten the personal relationship based on the love of God that marks Christian communion. According to Clowney it is the search for wisdom, not ecstasy, that marks the path of Christian meditation, a wisdom sought in the "Christ of Scripture and the Scripture of Christ".

A 1989 document generally known as Aspects of Christian meditation set forth the position of the Holy See with respect to the differences between Christian and eastern styles of meditation. The document, issued as a letter to all Catholic bishops, stresses the differences between Christian and eastern meditative approaches. It warns of the dangers of attempting to mix Christian meditation with eastern approaches since that could be both confusing and misleading, and may result in the loss of the essential Christocentric nature of Christian meditation. The letter warned that euphoric states obtained through Eastern meditation should not be confused with prayer or assumed to be signs of the presence of God, a state that should always result in loving service to others. Without these truths, the letter said, meditation, which should be a flight from the self, can degenerate into a form of self-absorption.

Some authors emphasize similarities between Christian meditation and non-Christian meditation. Psychologist Daniel Goleman gives an overview of many styles of meditation in The Varieties of the Meditative Experience, and includes a section on what he believes are key commonalities (as well as differences); he argues that all share the goal of the cultivation of attention. Thomas Merton, an American Catholic monk, believed Christianity had forsaken its mystical tradition in favor of Cartesian emphasis on rationality and concepts. Eastern traditions, for Merton, were mostly untainted by this type of thinking and thus had much to offer in terms of how to think of and understand oneself. Having studied the Desert Fathers and other Christian mystics, Merton found many parallels between the language of these Christian mystics and the language of Zen philosophy. This said, Merton felt non-Christian religions had little or nothing to contribute in terms of doctrine.

Meditation and prayer can mean different things depending on the religion, sect, school, or individual. Some even believe that meditation and prayer can mean the same thing. Scholar, Rita Gross notes in her article "Meditation and Prayer: A Comparative Inquiry", that there is an incorrect stereotype that Buddhist meditation is only a quiet and solitary practice, when in reality many Tibetan Buddhist use the word 'prayer' quite frequently as they even direct their prayers to being separate from themselves. Gross discusses the similarities in the way Christian prayers are also used as petitions, pleading for some sort of action or emotion from God. The discussion of prayer and meditation can be an intimate and sacred topic, as Gross has portrayed it here.

Another article regarding the comparison of Buddhist and Christian prayer is Robert Aitken's "Formal Practice: Buddhist or Christian." Aitken details seven different Buddhist practices and describes how they might connect with Christian practices. To name just a couple, the sange, is nearly the same practice as Christian confession, both involve a daily expression of wrong doings, with the intention of realizing the good, being the Dharma for Buddhist and God for Christians. Another Buddhist practice described to support Aitken's argument is the Nembutsu, a chant, or prayer, meant to elicit an influential super-being in Buddhism, Amida. No doubt there is a comparison that Aitken draws here between Christian prayer to God and the Buddhist Nembutsu.

Additionally, Kyeongil Jung writes of his own personal journey to find peace, or liberation from suffering, as he is consistent and engaged in both Christianity and Buddhism. Jung paints this complex scene in which it is possible to find liberation through these two religious paths, yet there are also four main dichotomies that he presents which he has climbed over in his own spiritual walk. The last one is of relevance to this section on meditation. Jung presents a more abstract case of a congenial plight on mindfulness; mediation and action, finding that there isn't one that comes without the other first. He asserts that "morality [social practice/action] and meditation strengthen and cultivate each other." He presents two anecdotes to demonstrate that mindfulness and movement are both synonymous and cyclical in practice.

== Old Testament references ==
In the Old Testament, there are two Hebrew words for meditation: hāgâ (Hebrew: הגה), which means to sigh or murmur, but also to meditate, and sîḥâ (Hebrew: שיחה), which means to muse, or rehearse in one's mind. When the Hebrew Bible was translated into Greek, hāgâ became the Greek melete which emphasized meditation's movement in the depth of the human heart. Melete was a reminder that one should never let meditation be a formality. The Latin Bible then translated hāgâ/melete into meditatio.

The Bible mentions meditate or meditation 23 times, 19 times in the Book of Psalms alone. When the Bible mentions meditation, it often mentions obedience in the next breath. An example is the Book of Joshua: "This Book of the Law shall not depart from your mouth, but you shall meditate on it day and night, so that you may be careful to do according to all that is written in it. For then you will make your way prosperous, and then you will have good success.."

== History ==
During the Middle Ages, the monastic traditions of both Western and Eastern Christianity moved beyond vocal prayer to Christian meditation. These progressions resulted in two distinct and different meditative practices: Lectio Divina in the West and hesychasm in the East. Hesychasm involves the repetition of the Jesus Prayer, but Lectio Divina uses different Scripture passages at different times and although a passage may be repeated a few times, Lectio Divina is not repetitive in nature.

The four movements of Lectio Divina: read, meditate, pray, contemplate

The progression from Bible reading, to meditation, to loving regard for God, was first formally described by Guigo II, a Carthusian monk who died late in the 12th century. Guigo II's book The Ladder of Monks is considered the first description of methodical prayer in the western mystical tradition.

In Eastern Christianity, the monastic traditions of "constant prayer" that traced back to the Desert Fathers and Evagrius Pontikos established the practice of hesychasm and influenced John Climacus' book The Ladder of Divine Ascent by the 7th century. These meditative prayers were promoted and supported by Saint Gregory Palamas in the 14th century.

The methods of "methodical prayer" as taught by the Devotio Moderna group in northern Europe had entered Spain and were known in the early 16th century. The book The Imitation of Christ which was known in Spain as Contemptus mundi became known in Spain, and while Teresa probably did not initially know of Guigo II's methods she was likely influenced by its teachings via the works of Francisco de Osuna which she studied. Teresa's contemporary and collaborator, John of the Cross continued the tradition of Guigo II and taught the four stages of Lectio Divina. By the 19th century the importance of biblical meditation had also been firmly established in the Protestant spiritual tradition.

During the 18th and early 19th centuries, some components of meditation had started to be de-emphasized in some branches of Western Christianity. The early 20th century brought a revival and books and articles on approaches such as Lectio Divina aimed at the general public began to appear by the middle of the century.

In 1965, one of the principal documents of the Second Vatican Council, the dogmatic constitution Dei verbum (Latin for Word of God), emphasized the use of Lectio Divina and on the 40th anniversary of Dei verbum in 2005 Pope Benedict XVI reaffirmed its importance.

== Approaches ==
A number of saints and historical figures have followed and presented specific approaches to Christian meditation. Both Eastern and Western Christian teachings have emphasized the use of meditation as an element in increasing one's knowledge of Christ. The Spiritual Exercises of Ignatius of Loyola use meditative mental imagery, with the goal of knowing Christ more intimately and loving him more ardently. In The Way of Perfection, St. Theresa of Avila taught her nuns how to try to get to know Christ by using meditation and mental prayer. Hesychastic prayer and meditation continues to be used in the Eastern Orthodox tradition as a spiritual practice that facilitates the knowing of Christ.

=== St. Ignatius of Loyola ===
The Spiritual Exercises of St. Ignatius of Loyola (1491–1556), the founder of the Jesuits, contain numerous meditative exercises. To this day, the Spiritual Exercises remain an integral part of the Novitiate training period of the Roman Catholic religious order of Jesuits.

The exercises are intended as notes to guide a spiritual director who is leading someone else through an experience of Christian meditation. The entire experience takes about 30 days and often involves a daily interview with the director. The process begins with a consideration of the purpose of one's life and the relationship with the rest of creation. It is followed by a week of meditation about sin and its consequences. Next comes a period of meditating on the events of the life of Jesus, and another for thinking about his suffering and death. The final week is to experience the joy of the resurrection, and in conclusion to reflect on God's love and the response of love for God.

The exercises often involve imagery in which one enters a biblical scene. For example, the practitioner is encouraged to visualize and meditate upon scenes from the life of Christ, at times asking questions from Christ on the cross, during crucifixion.

=== St. Teresa of Avila ===
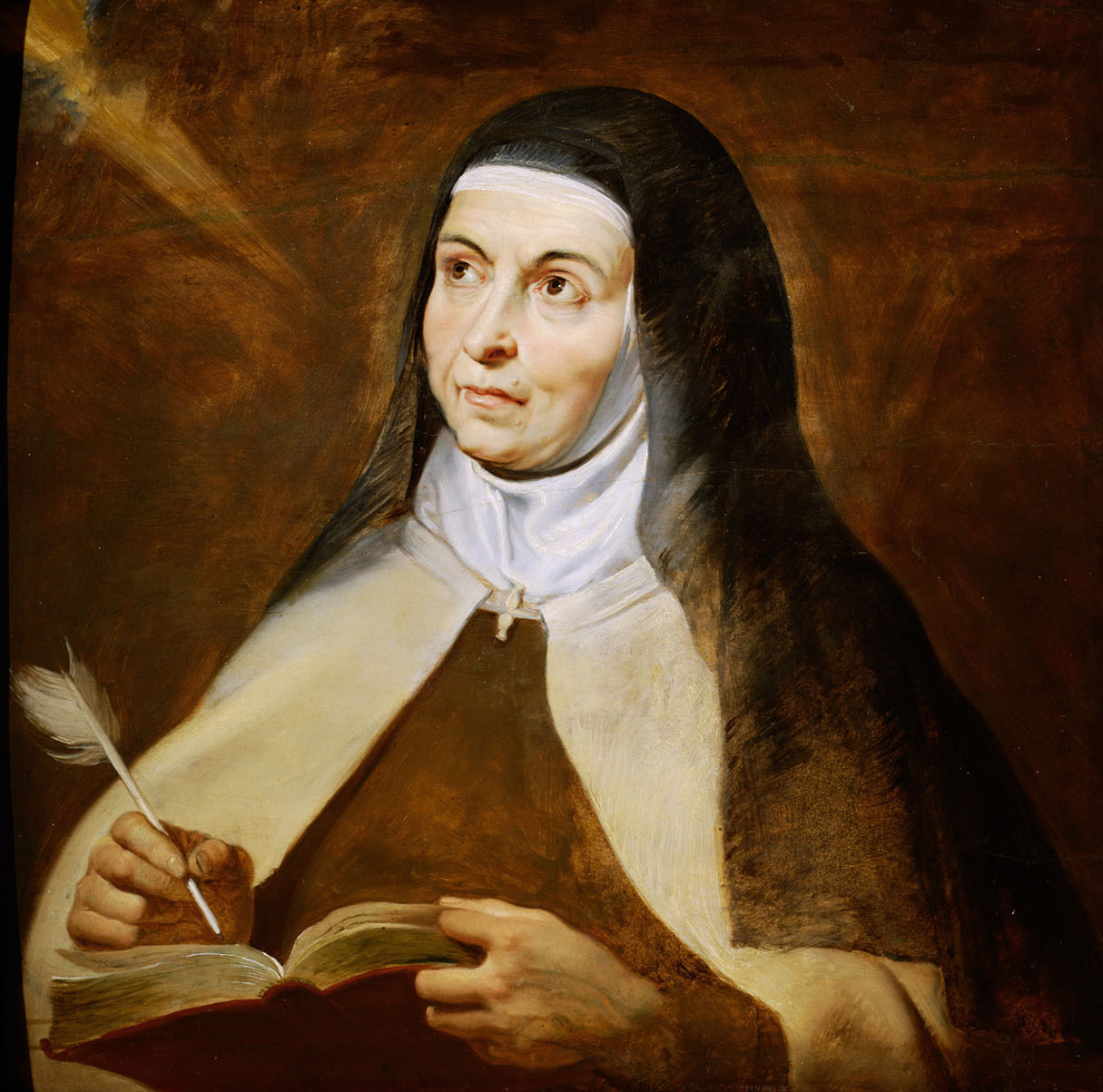
Saint Teresa of Avila depicted by Rubens, 1615. She is often considered one of the most important Christian mystics.

St. Teresa of Ávila (1515–1582) a Doctor of the Church, practiced contemplative prayer for periods of one hour at a time, twice a day. St. Teresa believed that no one who was faithful to the practice of meditation could possibly lose his soul. Her writings are viewed as fundamental teachings in Christian spirituality.

St. Teresa taught her nuns to meditate on specific prayers. Her prayers described in The Way of Perfection involve meditation on a mystery in the life of Jesus and are based on the faith that "God is within", a truth that Teresa said she learned from St. Augustine.

In her Life, she wrote that she taught herself from the instructions given in the book, The Third Spiritual Alphabet – by Francisco de Osuna – which relates to Franciscan mysticism. Her starting point was the practice of "recollection", i.e. keeping the senses and the intellect in check and not allowing them to stray. In her meditations, one generally restricts attention to a single subject, principally the love of God. In The Way of Perfection she wrote: "It is called recollection because the soul collects together all the faculties and enters within itself to be with God". She would use devices such as short readings, a scene of natural beauty or a religious statue or picture to remind her to keep her focus. She wrote that in due course, the mind naturally learns to maintain focus on God almost effortlessly.

St. Theresa viewed Christian meditation as the first of four steps in achieving "union with God", and used the analogy of watering the garden. She compared basic meditation to watering a garden with a bucket, Recollection to the water wheel, Quiet (contemplation) to a spring of water and Union to drenching rain.

Early studies on states of consciousness by Roland Fischer found evidence of mystical experience in the writings of Saint Teresa of Avila. In her autobiography she writes that, at the peak of a praying experience "... the soul neither hears nor sees nor feels. While it lasts, none of the senses perceives or knows what is taking place". This corresponds to the fourth stage described by Saint Teresa, "Devotion of Ecstasy", where the consciousness of being in the body disappears, as an effect of deep transcendent meditation in prayer.

=== Saint Francis de Sales ===
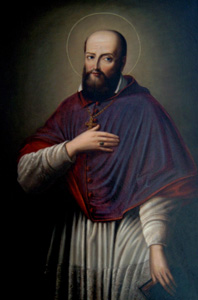
Saint Francis de Sales

Saint Francis de Sales (1576–1622) used a four-part approach to Christian meditation based on "preparation", "consideration", "affections and resolutions" and "conclusions":

- In the preparation part, one places oneself in the presence of God and asks the Holy Spirit to direct the prayer, as in the Epistle to the Romans: "The Spirit helps us in our weakness, for we do not know what to pray for, but the Spirit himself intercedes for us with sighs too deep for words."
- In the consideration part, one focuses on a specific topic, e.g. a passage from the Bible.
- In the affections and resolutions part, one focuses on feelings and makes a resolution or decision. For instance, when meditating on the Parable of the Good Samaritan one may decide to visit someone sick and be kind to them.
- In the conclusion part, one gives thanks and praise to God for the considerations and asks for the grace to stand by the resolution.

=== Other ===
John Main OSB (1926–1982) was a Benedictine monk and priest who presented a way of Christian meditation which used a prayer-phrase or mantra. This approach was then used by groups which then become the World Community for Christian Meditation. James Finley is a former Trappist monk and clinical psychologist who teaches meditation Center for Action and Contemplation, founded by Richard Rohr. His approach to Christian meditation is detailed in his book Christian Meditation: Experiencing the Presence of God.

== By Christian denomination ==
=== Western Christianity ===
==== Catholicism ====
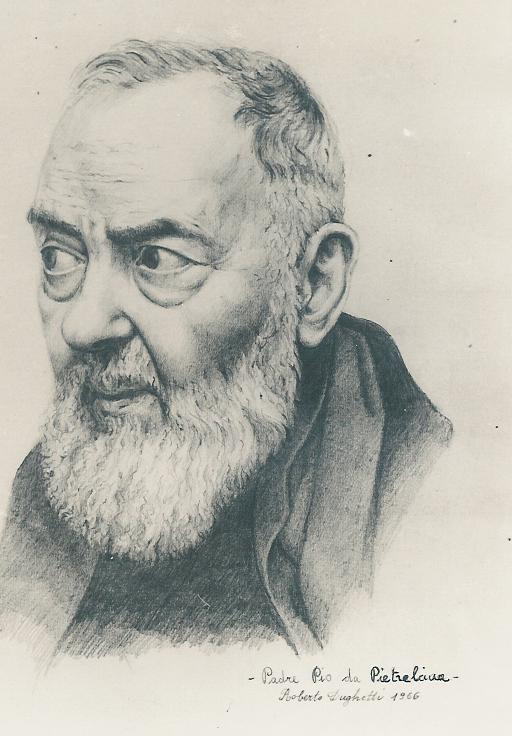
Saint Padre Pio stated: "Through the study of books one seeks God; by meditation one finds him".

Saint Thomas Aquinas (1225–1274) said that meditation is necessary for devotion, and the Second Vatican Council called for "faithful meditation on God's word" as part of the spiritual formation of seminarians.

Saint John of the Cross (1542–1591), a close friend of St. Teresa of Avila, viewed Christian meditation as a necessary step toward union with God, and wrote that even the most spiritually advanced persons always needed to regularly return to meditation.

The Catechism of the Catholic Church encourages meditation as a form of prayer: "Meditation is above all a quest. The mind seeks to understand the why and how of the Christian life, in order to adhere and respond to what the Lord is asking" (Catechism section # 2705) and that Christians owe it to themselves to develop the desire to meditate regularly (# 2707). Emphasizing union with God, it states: "Meditation engages thought, imagination, emotion, and desire. This mobilization of faculties is necessary in order to deepen our convictions of faith, prompt the conversion of our heart, and strengthen our will to follow Christ. Christian prayer tries above all to meditate on the mysteries of Christ, as in lectio divina or the rosary. This form of prayerful reflection is of great value, but Christian prayer should go further: to the knowledge of the love of the Lord Jesus, to union with him" (#2708). Meditative prayer is different from contemplative prayer (See CCC 2709-2724).

Pope Francis said that meditation is a need for everyone. He noted that the term "meditation" has had many meanings throughout history, and that "the ancients used to say that the organ of prayer is the heart." Pope Francis stated that "The prayer of the Christian is first of all an encounter with the Other, with a capital "O": the transcendent encounter with God...That is, meditating means going – guided by a phrase from the Scripture, from a word – to the encounter with Jesus within us...And in this way, only in this way, can we find ourselves."

===== Eucharist =====
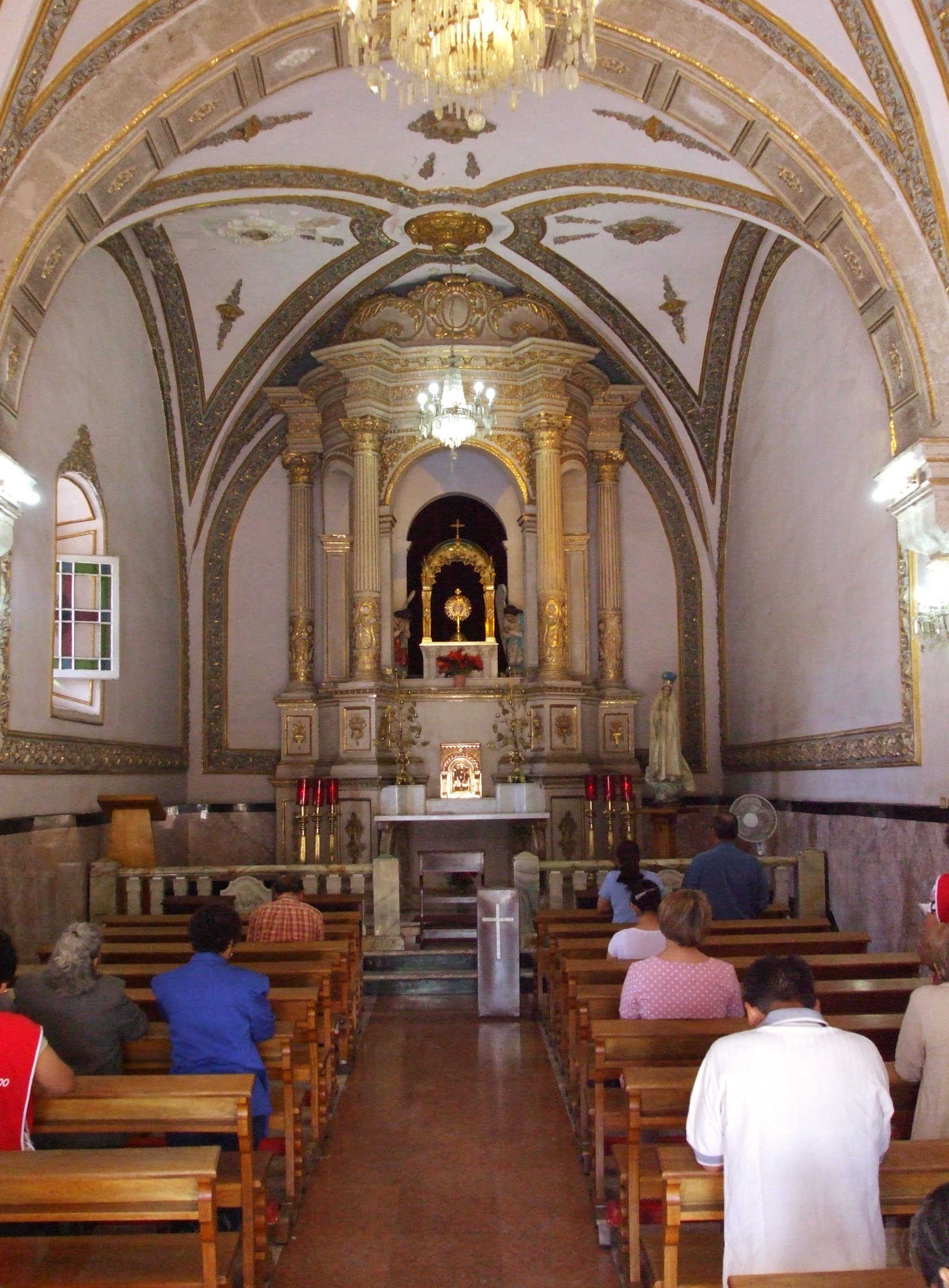
Eucharistic adoration and meditation, Cathedral of Chihuahua, Mexico

Christian meditation performed with Eucharistic adoration outside the context of the Mass has inspired extensive Catholic writing and inspirational literature, especially since the 18th century. The Eucharistic meditations of Saints Pierre Julien Eymard and Jean Vianney (both promoters of the Eucharist) were published as books.

Saint Thérèse of Lisieux was devoted to Eucharistic meditation and on February 26, 1895, shortly before she died, wrote from memory and without a rough draft her poetic masterpiece "To Live by Love", which she had composed during Eucharistic meditation.

Significant portions of the writings of the Venerable Concepcion Cabrera de Armida were reported to have been based on her adoration of the Blessed Sacrament. Similarly, in her book Eucharist: True Jewel of Eucharistic Spirituality, Maria Candida of the Eucharist (who was beatified by Pope John Paul II) wrote about her own personal experiences and reflections on Eucharistic meditation.

===== Rosary =====
Meditation is an integral part of the rosary. This mode of meditation is the process of reflecting on the mysteries of the rosary. With practice, this may in time turn into contemplation on the mysteries. The practice of meditation during the praying of repeated Hail Marys dates back to 15th century Carthusian monks, and was soon adopted by the Dominicans at large. By the 16th century the practice of meditation during the rosary had spread across Europe, and the book Meditationi del Rosario della Gloriosa Maria Virgine (i.e. Meditations on the Rosary of the Glorious Virgin Mary) printed in 1569 for the rosary confraternity of Milan provided an individual meditation to accompany each bead or prayer.

Saint Teresa of Avila's meditative approach of focusing on "the favor which God bestowed upon us by giving us His only Son" can be viewed as the basis of most scriptural rosary meditations. In his 2002 encyclical Rosarium Virginis Mariae, Pope John Paul II placed the rosary at the very center of Christian spirituality. Emphasizing that the final goal of Christian life is to be transformed, or "transfigured", into Christ he stated that the rosary helps believers come closer to Christ by contemplating Christ. He stated that the rosary unites us with Mary's own prayer, who, in the presence of God, prays with us and for us. and stated that: "To recite the rosary is nothing other than to contemplate with Mary the face of Christ."

==== Evangelical Lutheranism ====
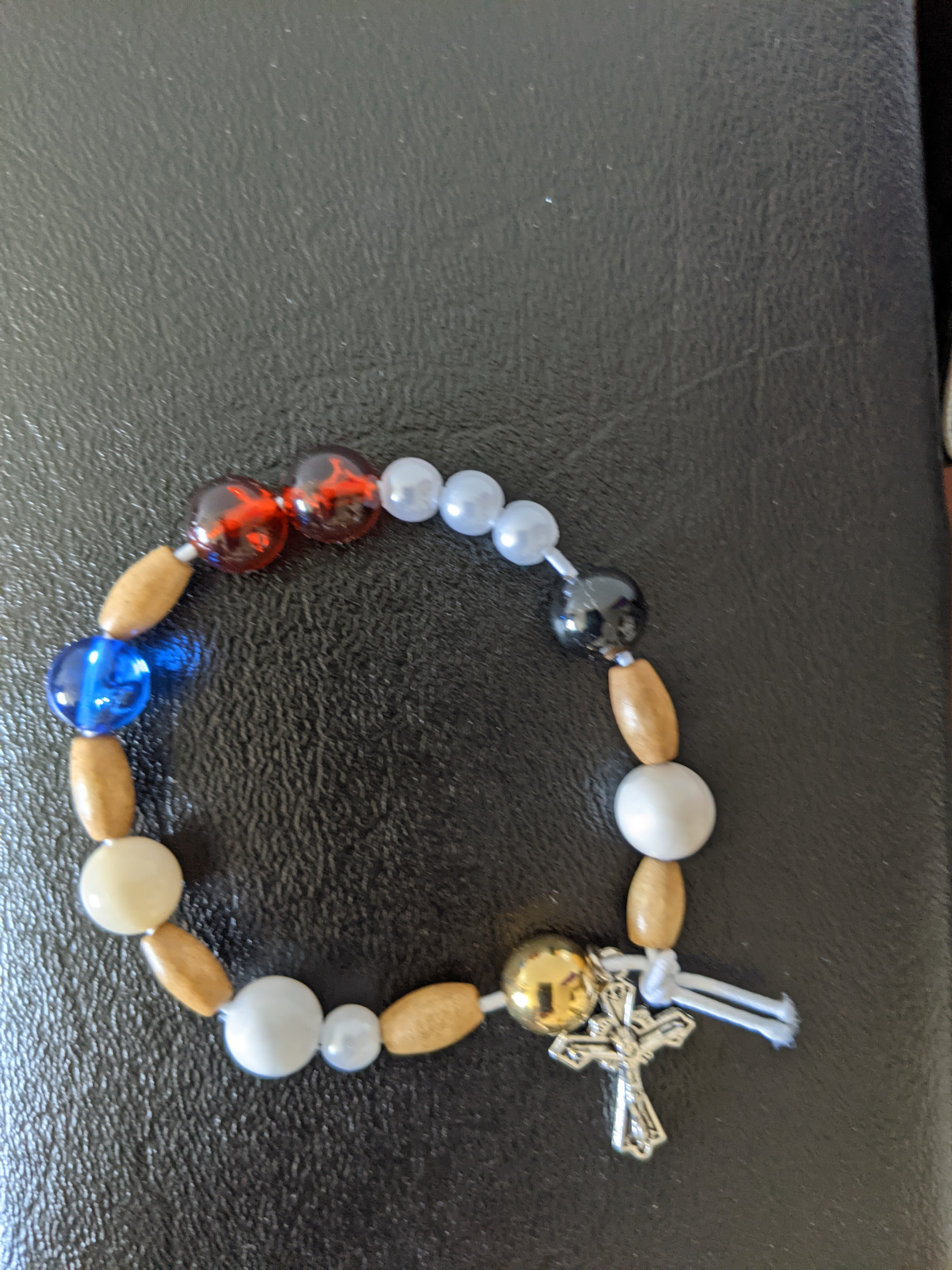
Wreath of Christ, a set of Lutheran prayer beads

Evangelical Lutheranism has a tradition of Christian mediation. Martin Luther wrote that: “You should meditate . . . by actually repeating and comparing oral speech and literal words of the book, reading and rereading them with diligent attention and reflection, so that you may see what the Holy Spirit means by them.” A practice of Lutheran meditation includes chanting the Psalms. The Wreath of Christ is a set of Lutheran prayer beads with certain themes on which believers meditate.

=== Eastern Christianity ===
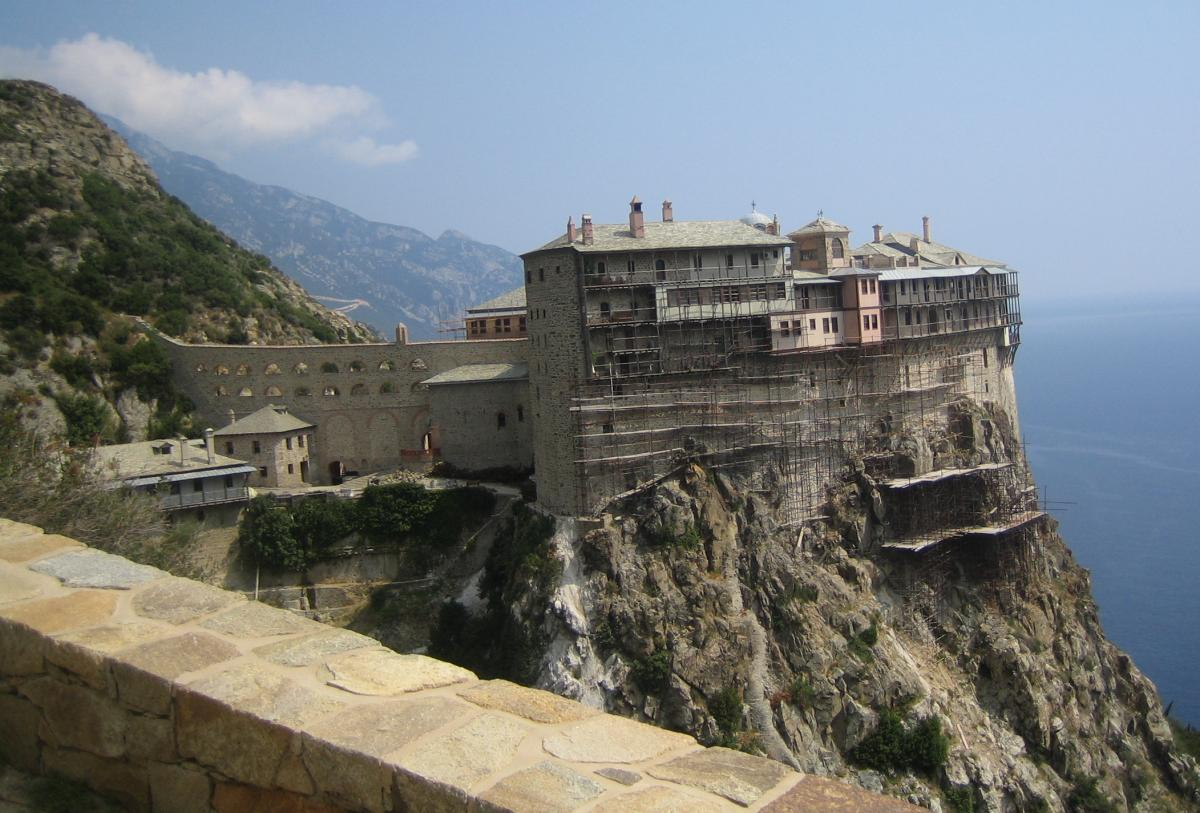
Simonopetra monastery on Mount Athos

During the Byzantine Empire, between the 10th and 14th centuries, a tradition of prayer called hesychasm developed, particularly on Mount Athos in Greece, and continues to the present. St. Gregory of Sinai is considered by most to be the founder of the hesychastic approach to prayer. This tradition uses a special posture and breathing rituals, accompanied by the repetition of a short prayer (traditionally the Jesus Prayer) giving rise to suggestions that it may have been influenced by Indian approaches. "While some might compare it [hesychastic prayer] with a mantra, to use the Jesus Prayer in such a fashion is to violate its purpose. One is never to treat it as a string of syllables for which the 'surface' meaning is secondary. Likewise, hollow repetition is considered to be worthless (or even spiritually damaging) in the hesychast tradition." Rather, it is to be in the spirit of a true mantra. This style of prayer was at first opposed as heretical by Barlam in Calabria, but was defended by Saint Gregory Palamas. Coming from hesychia ("stillness, rest, quiet, silence"), hesychasm continues to be practiced in the Eastern Orthodox Church and some other Eastern Churches of the Byzantine Rite. Hesychasm has not gained significance in neither the Western Christian Churches nor the Oriental Christian Churches.

In hesychasm, the Jesus prayer, consisting of the phrase: "Lord Jesus Christ, Son of God, have mercy on me" is repeated either for a set period of time or a set number of times. Hesychasm is contrasted with the more mental or imaginative forms of Christian meditation in which a person is encouraged to imagine or think of events from the life of Jesus or sayings from the Gospel. Sometimes hesychasm has been compared to the meditative techniques of oriental religions and it is possible that there were interactions between Hesychasts and Sufis, but this has not been proven.

== See also ==
- Christian meditation music
- Christian mysticism (contemplation)
- Daily devotional
- The Cloud of Unknowing
