= Laurence Freeman =

English Catholic priest and a Benedictine monk

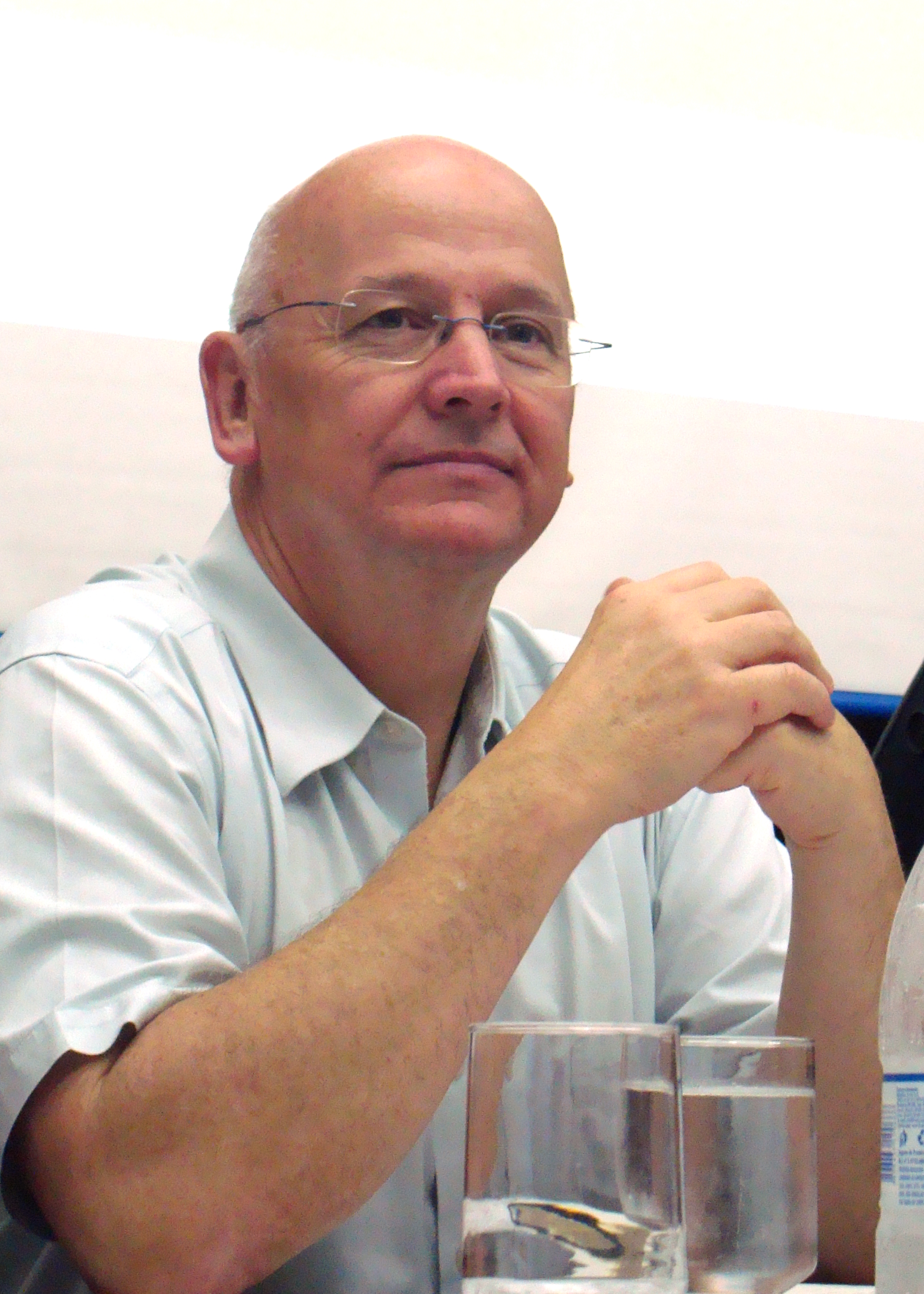
- Freeman in Porto Alegre, Brazil, in 2009

Personal life
- Born: 17 July 1951 (age 74) England

Religious life
- Religion: Christianity
- Denomination: Catholic
- Order: Benedictine
- Ordination: 1980

Laurence Freeman OSB (born 17 July 1951) is an English Benedictine monk and Catholic priest. He belongs to the Monastery of Sta Maria di Pilastrello, in Italy, of the Congregation of Monte Oliveto Maggiore. He is the director of the World Community for Christian Meditation (WCCM) prior of its Benedictine oblate community and director of Bonnevaux, the international centre of the WCCM in France.

== Life ==
Born in England in 1951, Freeman was educated by the Benedictines and studied English literature at New College, Oxford. Before entering monastic life he worked in banking and journalism and at the United Nations.

His spiritual teacher, whom he succeeded, was the Irish Benedictine monk John Main OSB. In 1975, Freeman joined Main at his monastery in London, Ealing Abbey, in starting the first Christian meditation centre. This led to an invitation from the Archdiocese of Montreal, Quebec, Canada, to start a new kind of Benedictine community of monks and lay members dedicated to the practice and teaching of meditation in the Christian tradition. Meditation was integrated into the Divine Office and Eucharist as it is still done in the WCCM and at Bonnevaux.

Freeman and Main started the Benedictine priory in Montréal in 1977. From this emerged over the following years the global spiritual family of WCCM.

Freeman studied theology at the Université de Montréal and at McGill University. He made his solemn monastic profession of religious vows in 1979 and was ordained to the priesthood in 1980 by Bishop Leonard Crowley in Montreal.

After John Main's death in 1982, Freeman continued the work of teaching meditation that soon began to develop into a global community. He began to teach around the world through talks, retreats and writings. He participated in the 1990-91 John Main Seminar led by Fr Bede Griffiths OSB Cam at which the WCCM was formally established.

In 1991 he returned to live in England to establish the international centre of the newly formed World Community for Christian Meditation which is now present in over 100 countries.

Strongly committed to inter-religious dialogue and international peace initiatives, from 1998 to 2000 Freeman took part in the "Way of Peace" programmes – a series of Christian-Buddhist dialogues with the Dalai Lama in India, Italy and Belfast. The programmes continued in 2013 with further dialogues in Sarnath, India. In 2006 he co-hosted a meeting at York University exploring the common ground between Christianity and Islam. He was a keynote speaker at the World Parliament of Religions in Melbourne, Australia, in 2009. In 1995, he led the John Main Seminar, "On Jesus", which was the seed of his book Jesus: The Teacher Within.

External videos
- Laurence Freeman in conversation with former Singapore prime minister Lee Kuan Yew, Youtube video

Freeman was awarded the Order of Canada in 2010 in recognition of his work of interfaith dialogue and the promotion of world peace.

Freeman's work also involves encouraging the teaching of meditation to children and university students. In 2005 he founded the John Main Centre for Meditation and Inter-Religious Dialogue at Georgetown University in the United States and sees the contemplative dimension of knowledge as an essential characteristic of all true education. In 2010 he launched the Meditatio outreach programme of WCCM to mark the celebration of its twentieth anniversary. Its seminars, forums and workshops engage in dialogue with the secular world and produces publications and resources on the themes of education, mental health, business, addiction and recovery, interfaith, environment and social justice.

In 2014 he began the MBA course Meditation and Leadership at the McDonough School of Business at Georgetown University which led to many initiatives in the business world and other fields which emphasised the connection between personal and organisation transformation.

In 2018, Freeman became director of Bonnevaux, near Poitiers, France, which is the international centre of the WCCM where he lives with a community living the Rule of Saint Benedict in a contemplative and contemporary way.

== Writings ==
Freeman is the author of many books, including Light Within, Jesus: The Teacher Within and Good Work: Meditation for Personal and Organisational Transformation. He is the principal editor of John Main's works.

- Good Work (2019)
- Christian Meditation: Essential Teaching Weekend (2019)
- Sensing God: Learning to Meditate During Lent (2016)
- Christian Meditation: Six-Week Introductory Course (2016)
- Beauty’s Field: Seeing the World (2014)
- Why are we here? (2012)
- The Goal of Life (2012)
- First Sight: The Experience of Faith (2011)
- Jesus, the Teacher Within (2010)
- The Selfless Self (2009)
- Christian Meditation: Your Daily Practice (2007)
- The Inner Pilgrimage (2007)
- A Simple Way (2004)
- A Pearl of Great Price (2002)
- Common Ground (1999)
- Web of Silence (1998)
- Aspects of Love (1997)
- A Short Span of Days (1991)
- Light Within: Meditation As Pure Prayer (1986)
