= Armellino =

Armellino is an Italian surname. Notable people with the surname include:

- Marco Armellino (born 1989), Italian footballer
- Mariano Armellino (1657–1737), Italian Benedictine historian
- Ricky Armellino, American musician, songwriter & producer, member of Ice Nine Kills
