= Middle Bridge, Basel =

Middle Bridge
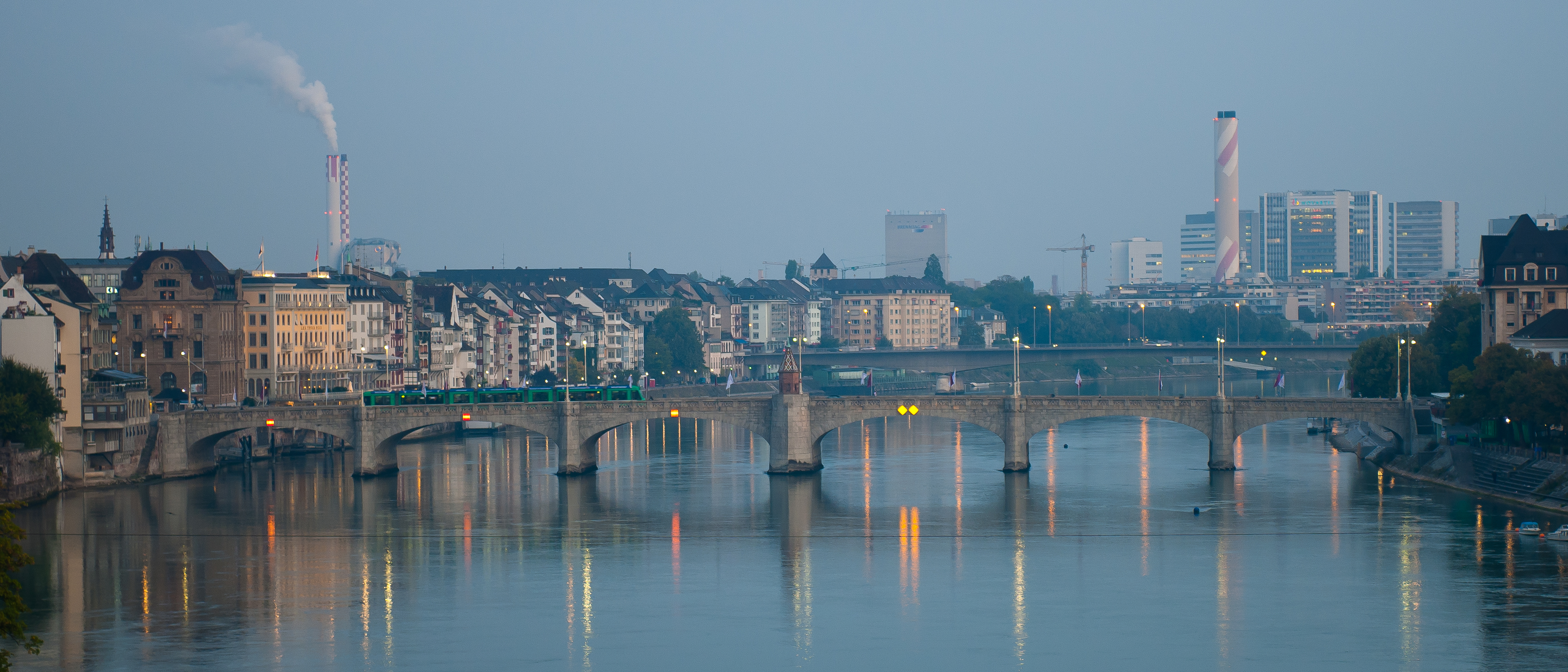
- Middle Bridge in 2011
- Coordinates: 47°33′36″N 7°35′23″E
- Carries: Pedestrians
- Crosses: Rhine
- Locale: Basel, Switzerland

Location
- Interactive map of Middle Bridge

The Middle Bridge (German: Mittlere Brücke [common name] / German: Mittlere Rheinbrücke [official name], French: Pont du Milieu) is a historic bridge in the Swiss city of Basel. It is situated on the oldest existing bridge site across the Rhine, between Lake Constance and the North Sea. It also marks the boundary between the High Rhine (Hochrhein) and Upper Rhine (Oberrhein/Rhin Supérieur) sections of the river.

== The Medieval Bridge ==
The first document pertaining to the Middle Bridge dates back to 1223. A loan document of that year shows that the bishop Heinrich of Basel (also known as Heinrich von Thun) temporarily transferred the cathedral treasury to a Jewish moneylender as deposit for a loan. The money was to be used for the construction of the Middle Bridge, the first bridge across the Rhine in Basel, which played a significant role in the development of trade in the city. The exact time of construction is unknown, but it must have been complete to a certain extent in 1224, since a document of that year mentions “Johannes on the Rhine bridge.”

In two documents from 1225, the monasteries of St. Blasien and Bürgeln are exempted from the bridge toll in return for their financial contributions. For mules, horses and goods crossing the bridge, there was a toll of 30 silver marks, which the bishop appropriated until the debt to the Jews of Basel was paid off.

The bridge gave the city a tremendous economic boost, and following its construction, the villages of Niederbasel and Oberbasel formed the fortified town of Kleinbasel on the eastern banks of the Rhine. It was united with Grossbasel in 1392.

== The Modern Bridge ==
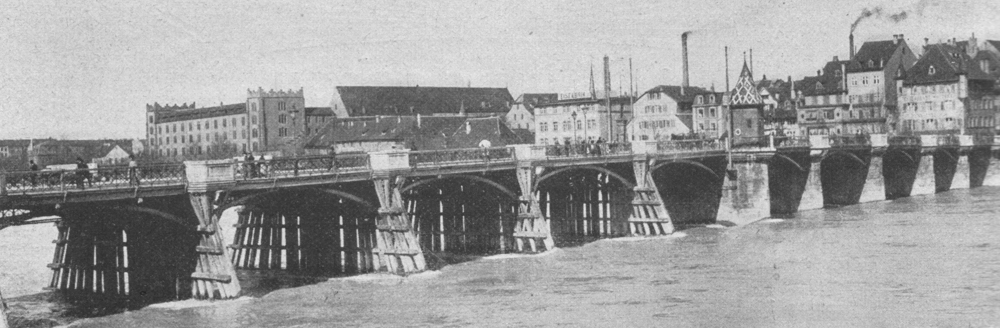
Old Rhine Bridge before 1903

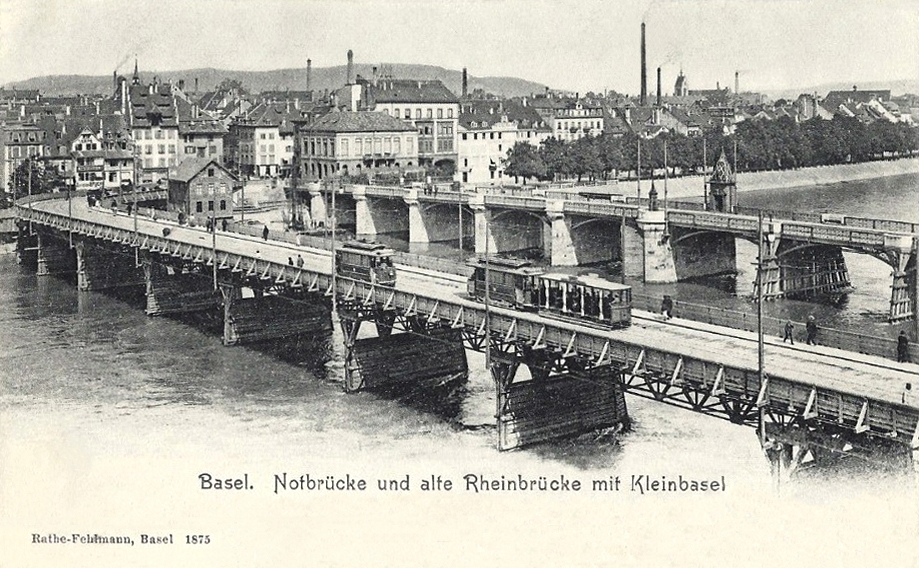
Temporary bridge - 1903-1905

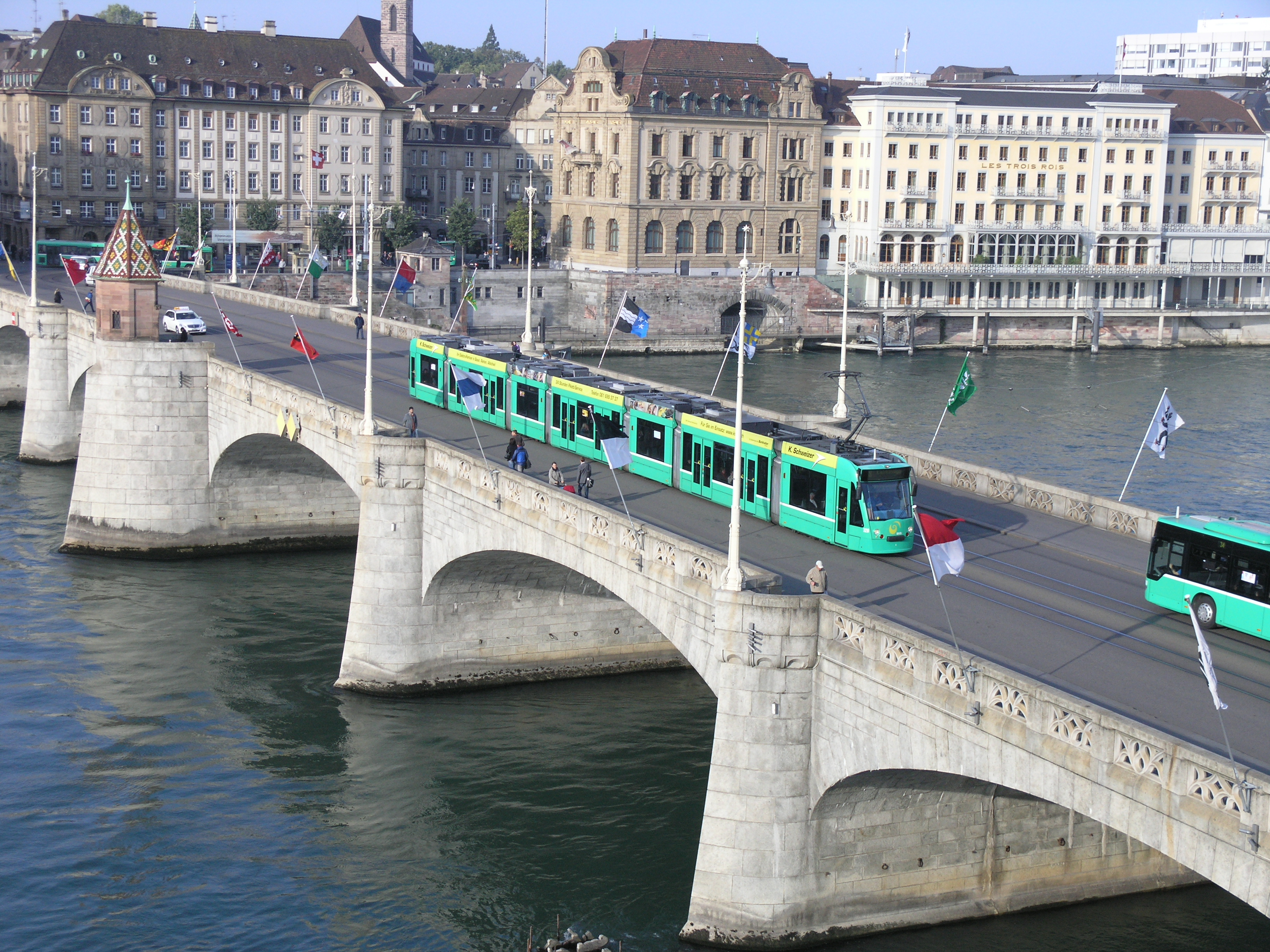
Middle Bridge - 2013

Between 1903 and 1905, the old bridge underwent a renovation project during which it was rebuilt entirely out of stone. The new construction was named «Middle Rhine Bridge». The old bridge was simply named the «Rhine Bridge» back when it was the sole bridge in Basel crossing the river; later, when the Wettstein and Johanniter bridges were built, it became known as the «Old Rhine Bridge». The name «Middle Rhine Bridge» was chosen because three bridges spanned the Rhein in Basel at the time, and this one was situated in the middle of the other two bridges.

The bridge is 192 meters long and 18.8 meters wide and is built out of granite from the north face of Saint-Gotthard Massif. The construction was undertaken by Albert Buss & Cie. from Pratteln and Philipp Holzmann from Frankfurt am Main, and cost 2.67 million Francs. The bridge features seven arches - six of which stretch across the Rhine, and one which stands over the riverside footpath on the New Town side. A reproduction of the bridge's Brückenkapelle known as the Käppelijoch, was built over the central support of the bridge. The bridge is a great work of historic bridge construction in Switzerland. Architectural and city planning deliberations played a decisive role in the choice of building materials and general design to be used for the bridge: in order to avoid interfering with the image of the old town, Emil Faesch from Basel was chosen to build the stonework of the bridge, while Friedrich von Thiersch from Munich was chosen to build its modern iron truss skeleton.

=== Construction ===
In order to avoid disrupting traffic over the Rhine, a temporary replacement bridge was constructed over twelve wooden truss supports a few meters away from the original bridge. The completed Bridge was unveiled to the public on the 11. November 1905 during a fair.

=== Renovation ===
The bridge was refurbished with no alterations made to its appearance in 2002.

The bridge has been closed to private motor vehicles as part of the car free city centre since the start of 2015. The pavements were widened by 40 cm at the cost of road space in the summer of 2017.

=== Art ===
==== «Amazone» ====
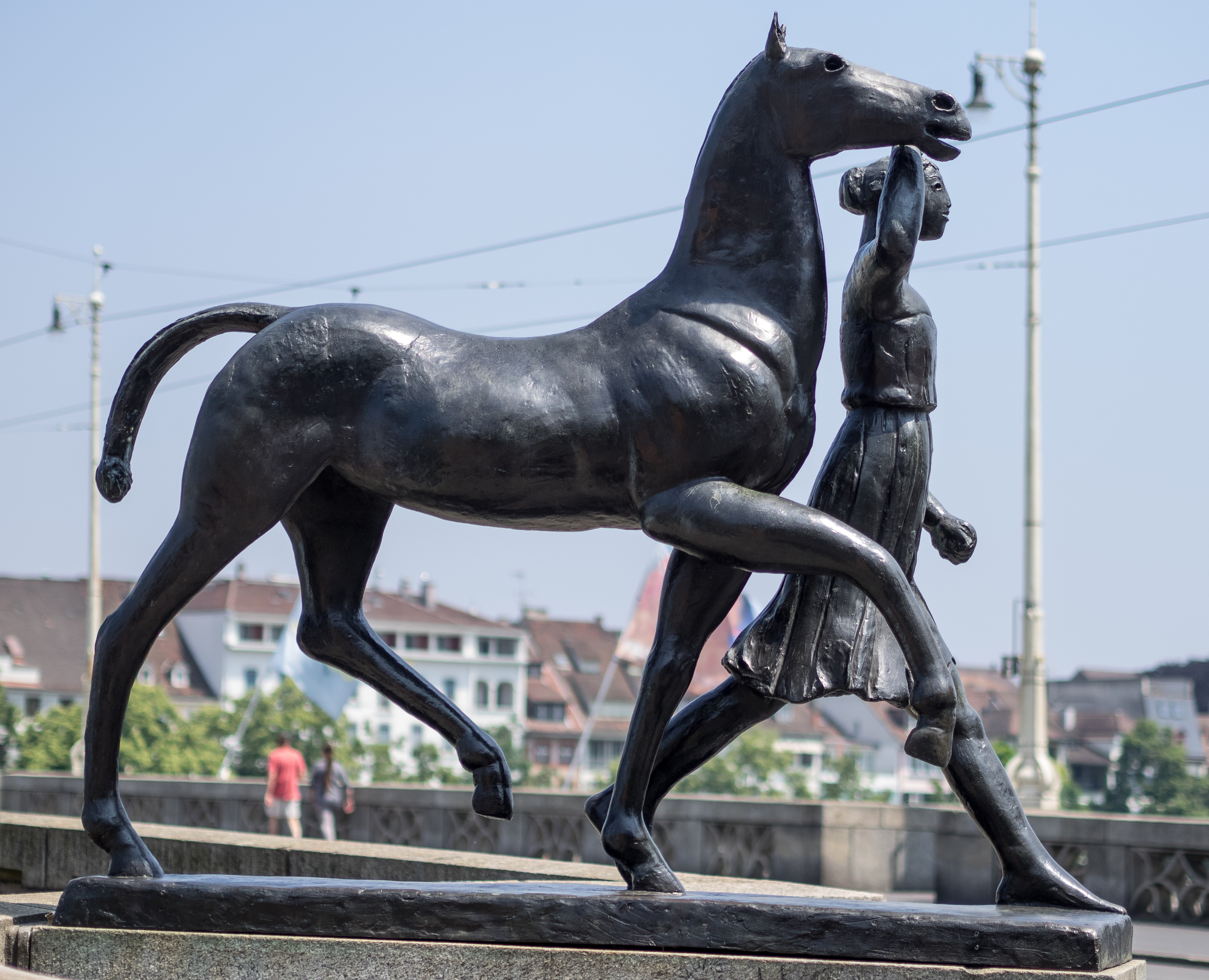
Carl Burckhardt Amazone

The Amazon sculpture by Carl Burckhardt, shown leading a horse, can be found by the Old Town Bridgehead. It was commissioned by the Basel art society and depicts a striding Amazon leading a horse. Burckhardt completed the plaster model for the statue, but succumbed to a short illness in 1923 before it was cast. The bronze cast was finalised after his death. There are visible trowel marks left over from the plaster model which Burckhardt likely would have removed had he not died before its completion. The Amazon would have also held slack reins in her hands. It is assumed that the sculpture remains uncompleted.

The Amazon was Burckhardt's last work. It was originally intended to be installed in the garden of the Kunsthalle, but due to the sudden unexpected death of its artist, the arts society donated it to the canton, which installed it in its present location. The piece has no relation to its current location and is purely considered a public art installation, sometimes mockingly referred to as Street furniture.

==== «Helvetia auf der Reise» ====
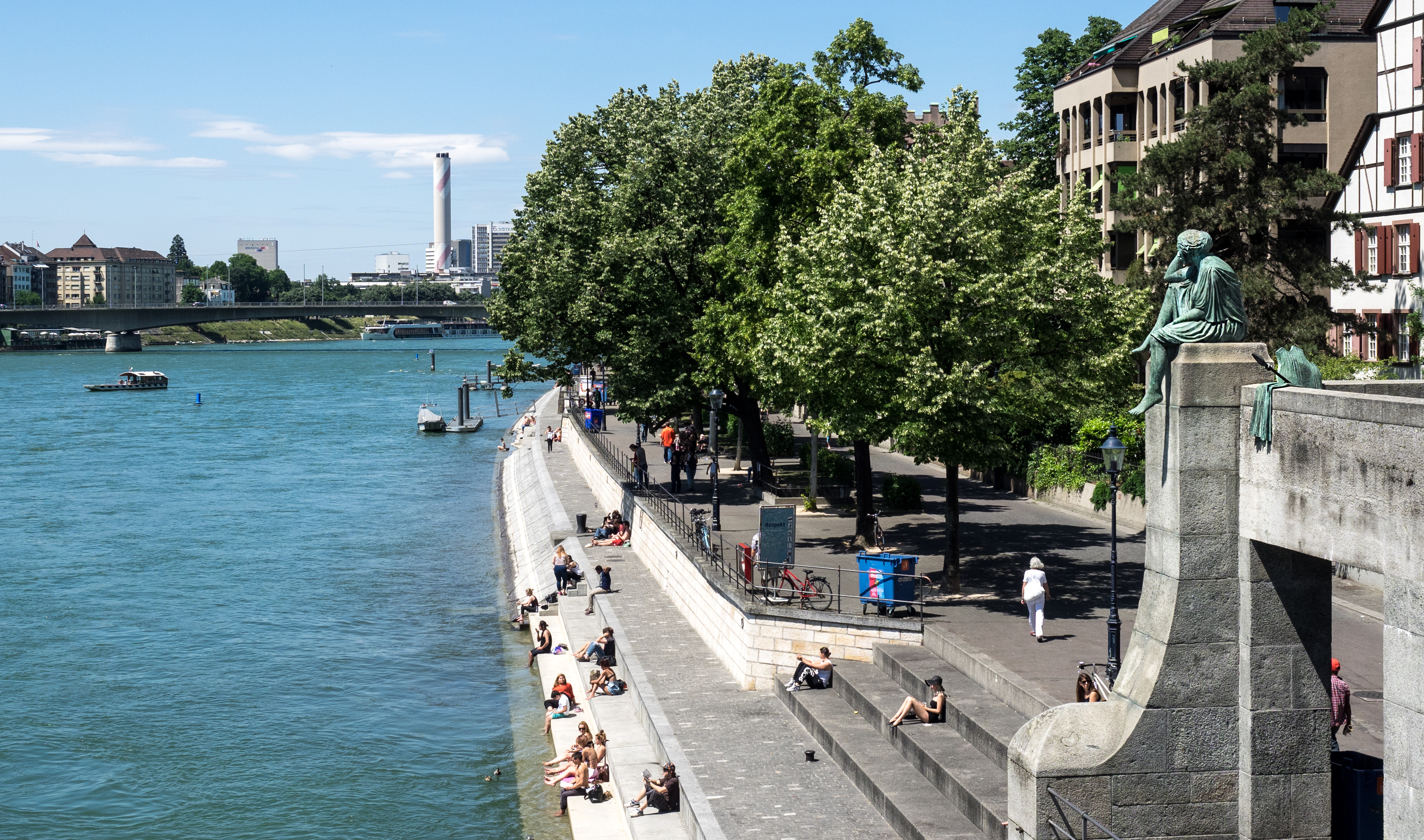
Helvetia auf der Reise

The sculpture Helvetia auf der Reise by Bettina Eichin was originally a 1980 entry in the Kunstkredit, an art competition in Basel. It depicts a woman who has laid her suitcase down, sitting pensively on a wall on the New Town bridgehead and looking out across the Rhine. The tablet mounted on the wall next to the figure reads "One day, Helvetia leaves the two franc coin, walks among the people, and embarks upon a long journey. On the way she travels through Basel. After a tiring walk through the city, she takes her coat off, lays down her suitcase and her spear and shield, and rests upon a pier on the Middle Bridge, looking thoughtfully up the Rhine…"

Bettina Eichin, whose art has always been politically conscious, said in an interview in 2010 "With the Helvetia allegory, I wanted to make the Helvetia allegory on our coins a woman again, to lift her from her embossing, for her to free herself - exactly how we women did. Only a few people 30 years ago understood what I wanted to express with the Helvetia sculpture. […] She steps out from the embossing of the coin - from money, goes on her way and rests upon her pedestal, tired, thoughtful, and distant - qualities that are not valued in women. She gazes up the Rhine towards the pharmaceutical industry and beyond the borders. She has laid down her spear, left her symbols of power behind her, and her suitcase suggests she has been on the road - a century of packing suitcases, getting away and leaving."

==== «Lagerstätte» ====
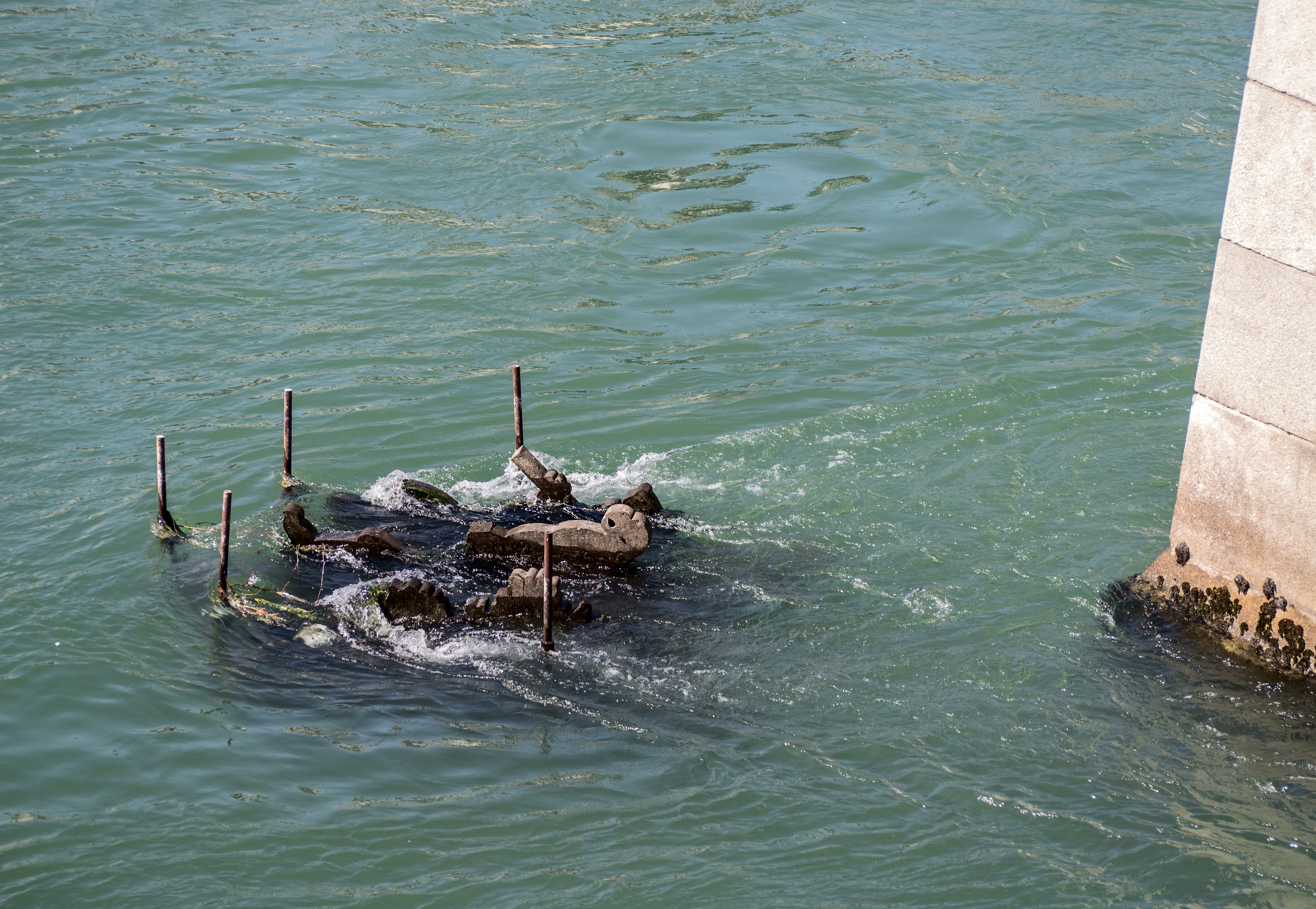
Lagerstaette beneath Middle Bridge

On the occasion of the 600 year celebration of the unification of Old and New Basel in 1992, the 3 lesser basel Ehrengesellschaften gifted the Canton the sculpture Lagerstätte by the artist Ludwig Stocker. It is located by the first pier of the bridge on the new town side, and depicts the 3 symbols of the Ehrengesellschafts, the Vogel Gryff, the Wild Maa, and the Leu, lying alongside each other on a catafalque. Due to the sculpture being partially submerged in the Rhine, it can sometimes not be seen at all and only reasonably visible at best. The 3 Ehrengesellschafts had originally intended for the sculpture to be placed in Claraplatz or on the river bank, but were denied by the canton. Finally, the current location was agreed upon.

== See also ==
- List of bridges over the Rhine
