= Bürgel =

- Town
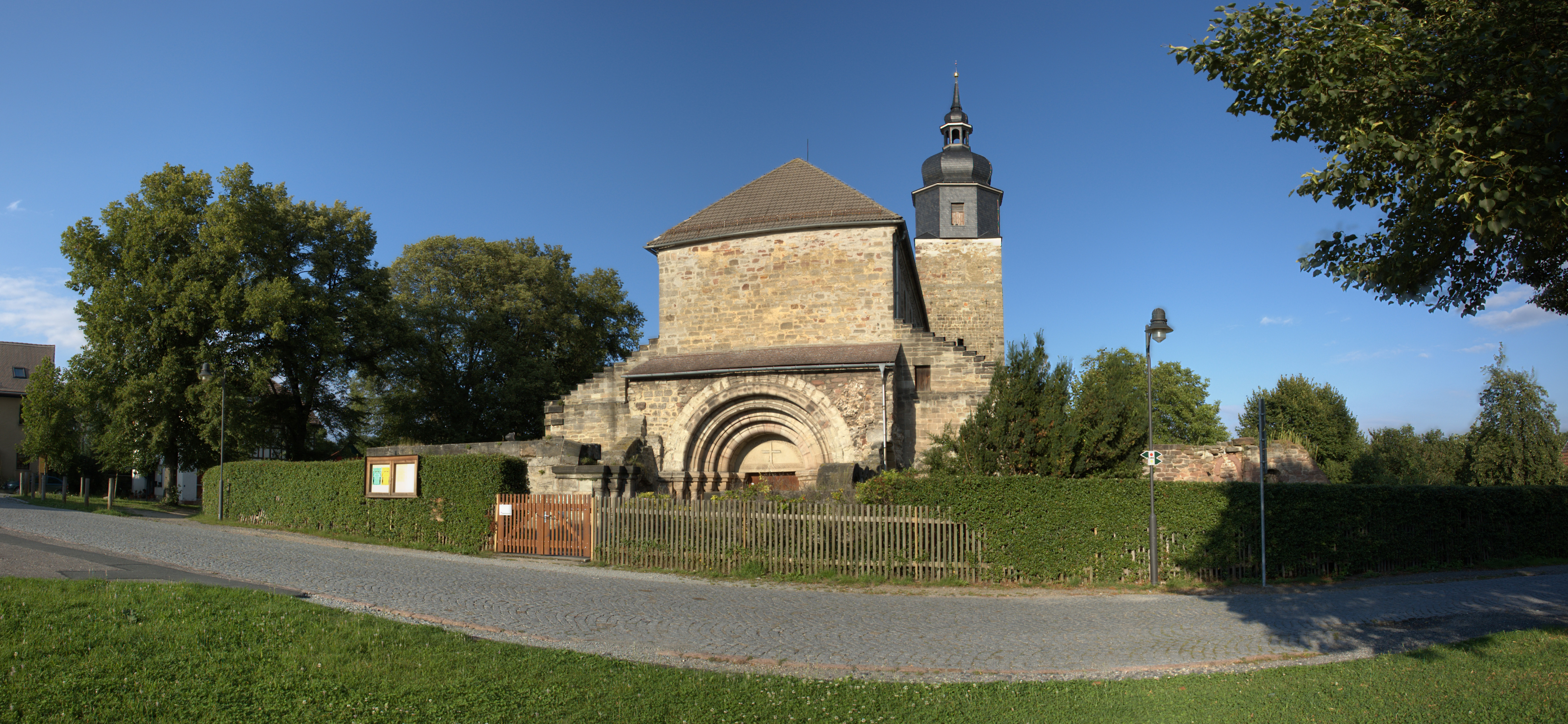

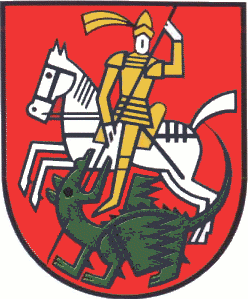
- Coat of arms

- Location of Bürgel within Saale-Holzland-Kreis district
- Interactive map of Bürgel
- Location within Germany Location within Thuringia
- Coordinates: 50°56′29″N 11°45′14″E
- Country: Germany
- State: Thuringia
- District: Saale-Holzland-Kreis
- Subdivisions: 14

Government
  - Mayor (2021–27): Johann Waschnewski (CDU)

Area
  - Total: 27.19 km^{2} (10.50 sq mi)
- Elevation: 254 m (833 ft)

Population (2025-12-31)
  - Total: 3,099
  - Density: 114.0/km^{2} (295.2/sq mi)
- Time zone: UTC+01:00 (CET)
  - Summer (DST): UTC+02:00 (CEST)
- Postal codes: 07616
- Dialling codes: 036692
- Vehicle registration: SHK, EIS, SRO
- Website: www.stadt-buergel.de

Bürgel (German pronunciation: [ˈbʏʁɡl̩]) is a town in the Saale-Holzland district, in Thuringia, Germany. It is situated 12 km east of Jena. It contains the Benedictine monastery of Bürgel Abbey.

== History ==
Within the German Empire (1871-1918), Bürgel was part of the Grand Duchy of Saxe-Weimar-Eisenach.

== Sons and daughters of the city ==
- Zacharias Brendel der Ältere (1553-1626), philosopher, physicist, physician and botanist at the University of Jena
