= Pietro Luigi Galletti =

Italian Benedictine, historian and archaeologist

Pietro Luigi Galletti (1724 – 13 December 1790) was an Italian Benedictine monk, historian, and archaeologist.

== Biography ==
He was born and educated in Rome where he entered the Benedictine Order. While a monk in the Abbey of St. Paul Without the Walls, he made a collection of the numerous ancient inscriptions used in the pavement of the floor of the famous basilica or scattered among the cloister buildings and in the surrounding vineyards. These became soon the nucleus of a classified museum of Christian and Pagan inscriptions. Later on he became keeper of the archives and librarian of the Benedictines in Florence. Pius VI bestowed various benefices on him and made him titular Bishop of Cyrene. He died in Rome.

His collection of inscriptions and his works on the higher papal officials of the old Lateran Palace remained authoritative for some time. His writings were directed to widely divergent periods and spheres of historical and archaeological research. On Roman antiquity he wrote: Capena, municipio dei Romani (Rome, 1756), and Gabbio, antica città di Sabina, scoperta ove era Torri (Rome, 1757). His two works Del Vestarario della santa Romana chiesa (Rome, 1758), and Del Primicerio della S. Sede Apostolica e di altri Uffiziali Maggiori del Sacro Palazzo Lateranense (Rome, 1776) deal with the early history of the Roman Curia. The latter work is especially thorough and important. Among his contributions to the history of the religious orders the following are noteworthy: Lettera intorno la vera e sicura origine del ven. ordine di S. Girolamo (Rome, 1755), and Raggionamento dell'origine e de'primi tempi dell'abbadia Fiorentina (Rome, 1773). He was the author of a biography of the bishops of Viterbo, Lettera a Giannantonio Bersetta sopra alcuni vescovi di Viterbo (Rome, 1759), and of Cardinal Domenico Silvio Passionei, Memorie per servire alla storia della vita del card. Domenico Passionei (Rome, 1762). His work on three early churches of Rieti deals with Christian archaeology: Memoria di tre antiche chiese di Riete, S. Michele Arcangelo, S. Agata alla Rocca, S. Giacomo (Rome, 1765). Finally, he produced first great collection of medieval inscriptions, treated as a source of historical information. His Inscriptiones Venetae infimi aevi Romae exstantes (Rome, 1757) was followed in the same series by the inscriptions found in Rome concerning Bologna, Rome itself (3 vols.), the March of Ancona, and Piedmont, in all seven volumes (1757–66).
