= Colomba Gabriel =

Blessed Colomba Matylda Gabriel OSB
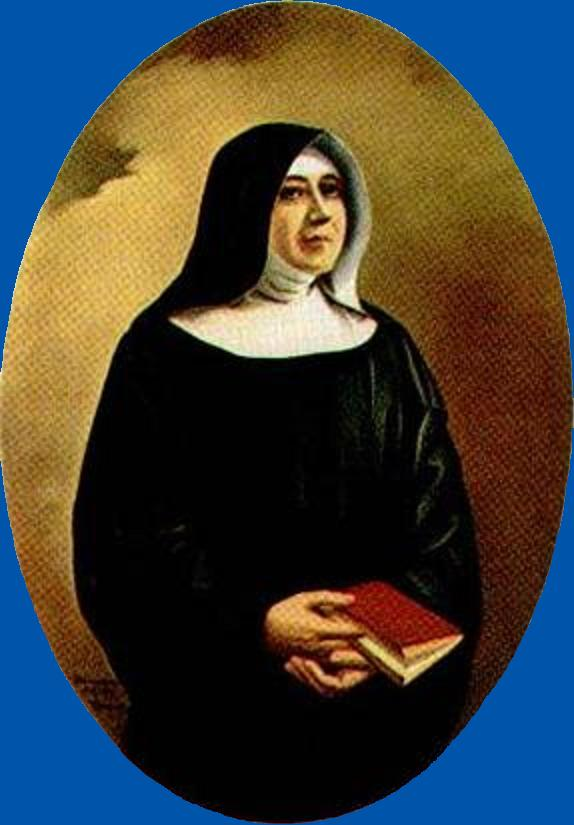

Virgin
- Born: 3 May 1858; Ivano-Frankivsk, Galicia, Austrian Empire
- Died: 24 September 1926 (aged 68); Rome, Kingdom of Italy
- Venerated in: Roman Catholic Church
- Beatified: 16 May 1993, Saint Peter's Square, Vatican City by Pope John Paul II
- Feast: 24 September

Colomba Matylda Gabriel (3 May 1858 - 24 September 1926) was an Ukrainian nun. She is the founder of the Benedictine Sisters of Charity. Gabriel studied under the Order of Saint Benedict in Lviv and later became a Benedictine herself while dedicating herself to teaching at her old school before she was forced to relocate to Rome in 1900, where she founded her order and joined a Benedictine branch there.

Gabriel's beatification process opened in 1983, and she was titled as Venerable in 1990. Her beatification was celebrated in mid-1993.

== Life ==
Colomba Matylda Gabriel was born in 1858 to nobles.

In 1869, she started her education in Lviv under the Order of Saint Benedict at a school attached to their convent and she earned a diploma in teaching; she remained at her old school as a teacher. In 1882, she entered the Benedictines and assumed the religious name of "Janina". Her novitiate started on 30 August 1874, and she later made her solemn profession on 6 August 1882; she was appointed as prioress in 1889 and made novice mistress in 1894. She was later appointed as abbess of her house in 1897. Her spiritual director was the Dominican Hyacinthe-Marie Cormier.

In 1900, she was forced to relocate to Rome and received permission on 3 June 1902 to enter the Benedictine branch at Subiaco. She arrived in Rome in 1900 and then went to Subiaco in 1902 to enter the branch before returning to Rome in 1903 for her apostolate. Father Vincenzo Ceresi (1869-1958) suggested she found an order, and she founded the Benedictine Sisters of Charity with the opening of its first house on 25 April 1908; it received diocesan approval on 5 March 1926 from the Cardinal Vicar of Rome, Basilio Pompili. Pope Pius X and Pope Benedict XV held her order in esteem, as did the Italian queen Elena of Montenegro.

Gabriel died in 1926; her order in 2005 had 121 religious in 18 houses in places like Romania and Madagascar.

== Beatification ==
The beatification process opened in Rome on 16 June 1983 after the Congregation for the Causes of Saints issued the official "nihil obstat" and titled her as a Servant of God; the diocesan process was then held, and then the C.C.S. validated it on 20 June 1986. The C.C.S. later received the Positio in 1988 for their assessment. Theologians approved it on 28 November 1989, as did the C.C.S. on 8 May 1990 which allowed for Pope John Paul II to confirm her heroic virtue and title her as Venerable on 10 July 1990.

The miracle for beatification was investigated and then validated on 12 July 1990; a medical board approved it not long after on 2, June 1992. Theologians also assented to the miracle on 9 October 1992 as did the C.C.S. on 1 December, 1992; John Paul II approved this miracle on 21 December, 1992 and beatified Gabriel on 16 May, 1993.
