= Anthony Batt =

Anthony Batt (died 1651), was a Benedictine monk.

Batt resided for some years in the English monastery of his order at Dieulwart, in Lorraine. Benedictine archivist Dom Benet Weldon wrote that Batt died on 12 Jan. 1651, and added that Batt:

was a great promoter and practiser of regular discipline, a famous translator of many pious books into English. He wrote a most curious hand, and spent much of his time at La Celle, where there is a Catechism of a large size, which he composed at the instance of some of the fathers in the mission.

Batt's published works are:

- ‘A Heavenly Treasure of Confortable Meditations and Prayers written by S. Augustin, Bishop of Hyppon. In three severall Treatises of his Meditations, Soliloquies, and Manual,’ translation, St. Omer, 1624, 12mo.
- . ‘A Hive of Sacred Honie-Combes, containing most sweet and heavenly counsel, taken out of the workes of the mellifluous doctor S. Bernard, abbot of Clareual,’ Douay, 1631, 8vo.
- ‘A Rule of Good Life,’ translated from St. Bernard, Douay, 1633, 16mo.
- ‘Thesaurus absconditus in Agro Dominico inventus, in duas partes; 1° Precationes, 2° Meditationes,’ Paris, 1641, 12mo.
