= Magdalena Mortęska =

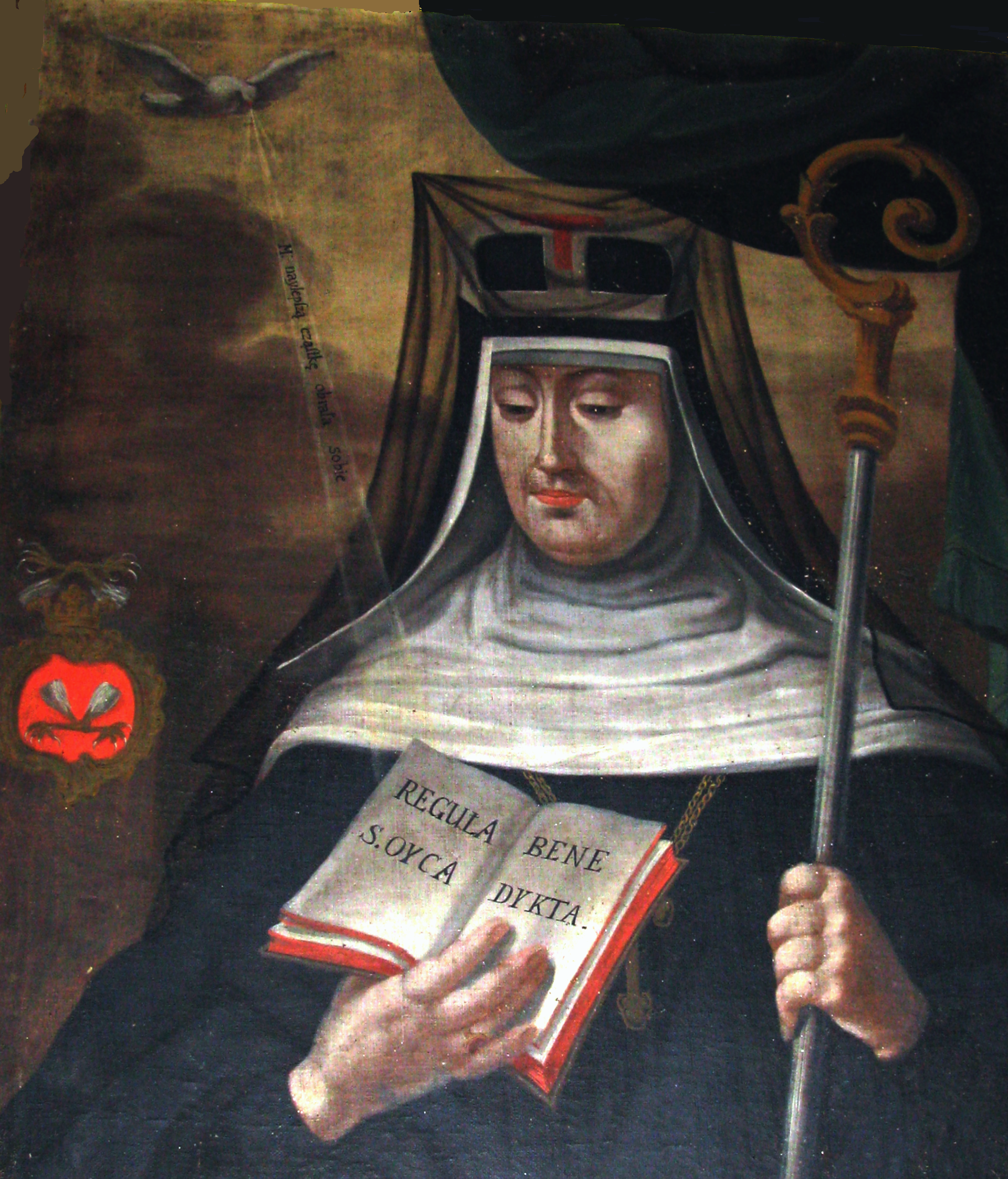
Magdalena Mortęska in the religious habit of a Benedictine, holding her crosier and the Rule of Saint Benedict (unknown painter of the 17th century

Magdalena Mortęska (2 December 1554 – 15 February, 1631), was a Polish Benedictine. She was abbess in the Benedictine nunnery in Chełmno, a mystic, and a writer of religious literature. She is regarded a Servant of God.

== Life ==
Magdalena Mortęska came from a family of wealthy nobility from Royal Prussia and is assumed to have been born on December 2, 1554, in Pokrzywno, near Grudziądz. Her father, Melchior, was the chamberlain of Malbork, and her mother, Elżbieta née Kostka, was the sister of the bishop of Chełmno, Piotr Kostka.

Despite her father's prohibition, Magdalena entered the Benedictine monastery in Chełmno in 1578. On June 4, 1579, she made her perpetual vows into the hands of her uncle, the Bishop of Chełmno, Piotr Kostka. A week after taking her vows, 25-year-old Magdalena Mortęska was elected abbess of the monastery.

She led the Benedictine convent out of the crisis it found itself in during the Reformation. She reformed the Rule of St. Benedict, complementing the contemplative nature of the monastery with the teaching of girls. In the resulting "Chełmno reform", the Benedictine nuns placed particular emphasis on the education of the nuns, who had to learn to read and write in Polish and Latin. She revived spirituality by introducing meditation and meditation, and at the same time limited too strict ascetic recommendations. One of the tasks of the monasteries was to provide education for girls - reading, writing, calculations, singing and handicrafts. These schools contributed to the development of education among women of noble and middle-class origins.

The reformed rule was accepted by the Roman Curia in 1605, and in 1606 it was officially approved by the Bishop of Chełmno, Wawrzyniec Gembicki. In 1589, Mother Magdalena obtained the possession of the Cistercian monastery in Żarnowiec, which she changed to a Benedictine monastery and staffed with nuns from Chełmno. In 1590, a monastery in Nieśwież, subordinated to Mortęska, was founded by Mikołaj Krzysztof Radziwiłł "Sierotka"; in 1603 she founded the monastery in Bysławek as a branch of Chełmno, and in 1604 the monastery in Lviv was subordinated to her. In the years 1604–1624, on her initiative, among others, monasteries in Poznań, Jarosław, Sandomierz, Sierpc and Grudziądz. In total, the Chełmno congregation during her lifetime numbered over 20 monasteries under the leadership of the Chełmno abbess. At the end of Mortęska's life, the further development of new foundations and monastic education was stopped by an epidemic and the war with Sweden in 1626–1629.

She also established a theological seminary in Poznań, educating chaplains for renovated monasteries; she participated in the foundation of the Jesuit college in Toruń in 1593. During her rule, a number of construction works were carried out in the Chełmno monastery, including adding several chapels to the monastery church and rebuilding the monastery buildings.

She died on February 15, 1631, after an illness lasting about a month.

== Works ==
She left numerous letters. Moreover, she is the author of two outstanding prose works that contribute to baroque religious and mystical literature. Both works contain important remarks about the dignity of the human person, freedom and human power, co-creating baroque Christian humanism and representing personalism, with its vision of the spiritual power of the individual. Both works were created as a record of Mortęska's monastic lectures for nuns, written down over the years by the sisters (subsequent listeners):

Spiritual teachings that constitute a commentary on the Holy Scriptures. meditations on the Passion of the Lord, a reflection on the Passion of Christ organized according to the pattern of Ignatian meditation.

== Beatification process ==
Shortly after her death, a cult began among the faithful and Benedictine nuns convinced of the holiness of her life. The Jesuit Stanisław Brzechwa wrote a life intended to prepare her beatification process. The body was then ceremoniously transferred to a separate grave in the crypt in front of the great altar of the monastery church.

In 1709, a special episcopal commission opened her grave, headed by Stanisław Józef Hozjusz, later Bishop of Poznań, and examined her body, which remained undamaged and was dressed in a new habit. However, the beatification process was soon suspended. Then, in 1741, a new coffin was made and moved to the nuns' common crypt. With the dissolution of the Benedictine monastery in 1817, her cult was forgotten and her body was hidden so that it could not be found. Later, the Sisters of Mercy lived in the monastery. In 1881, Sister Michalina Żemałkowska came to Chełmno and had dreams in which she found out where her coffin was. A search was then undertaken and she was found in a crypt outside the church walls. The date 1741 and the initials M. M. – X. K. C. (Magdalena Mortęska, abbess of the Chełmno monastery).

On April 4, 1953, a commission chaired by the Ordinary of the Chełmno diocese, Bishop Kazimierz Józef Kowalski with the participation of the historian Karola Górski opened the coffin and recognized M. Magdalena's body. It was dried, in relatively good condition, about 175 cm tall, missing its right eye, which she had gouged out in childhood. Her cult persisted in the Benedictine monasteries of the Chełmno reform until their dissolution.

Since 2006, her body has been resting in a crypt at the monastery in Chełmno. The beatification process has been initiated twice over the centuries, but without further success. It was only at the beginning of the 21st century that efforts to bring her to the altars were resumed. On December 18, 2015, Bishop Andrzej Suski of Toruń issued a special edict addressed to the faithful to provide them with materials and documents that could help in carrying out her beatification process.

After obtaining the consent of the Congregation for the Causes of Saints in Rome, in the church of St. John the Baptist and Saint Michael the Archangel in Lubawa, July 3, 2016, the process of her beatification was started by Bishop Andrzej Suski with a Pontifical Mass,
