= Benedictines =

Roman Catholic monastic order

Order of Saint Benedict
- Ordo Sancti Benedicti
- Coat of arms of the order

- Design on the obverse side of the Saint Benedict Medal
- Abbreviation: O.S.B.
- Formation: 529; 1497 years ago
- Founder: Benedict of Nursia
- Founded at: Subiaco Abbey
- Type: Catholic religious order
- Headquarters: Sant'Anselmo all'Aventino
- Members: 6,802 (3,419 priests) as of 2020
- Abbot Primate: Jeremias Schröder, OSB
- Main organ: Benedictine Confederation
- Parent organization: Catholic Church
- Website: osb.org

The Benedictines, officially the Order of Saint Benedict (Latin: Ordo Sancti Benedicti, abbreviated as O.S.B. or OSB), are a mainly contemplative monastic order of the Catholic Church for men and for women who follow the Rule of Saint Benedict. Initiated in 529, they are the oldest of all the religious orders in the Latin Church. The male religious are also sometimes called the Black Monks, especially in English speaking countries, after the colour of their habits, although some, like the Olivetans, wear white. They were founded by Benedict of Nursia, a 6th-century Italian monk who laid the foundations of Benedictine monasticism through the formulation of his Rule. Benedict's sister Scholastica, possibly his twin, also became religious from an early age, but chose to live as a hermit. They retained a close relationship until her death.

Despite being called an order, the Benedictines do not operate under a single hierarchy. They are instead organized as a collection of autonomous monasteries and convents, some known as abbeys. The order is represented internationally by the Benedictine Confederation, an organization set up in 1893 to represent the order's shared interests. They do not have a superior general or motherhouse with universal jurisdiction but elect an Abbot Primate to represent themselves to the Vatican and to the world.

In some regions, Benedictine nuns are given the title Dame in preference to Sister.

== Historical development ==
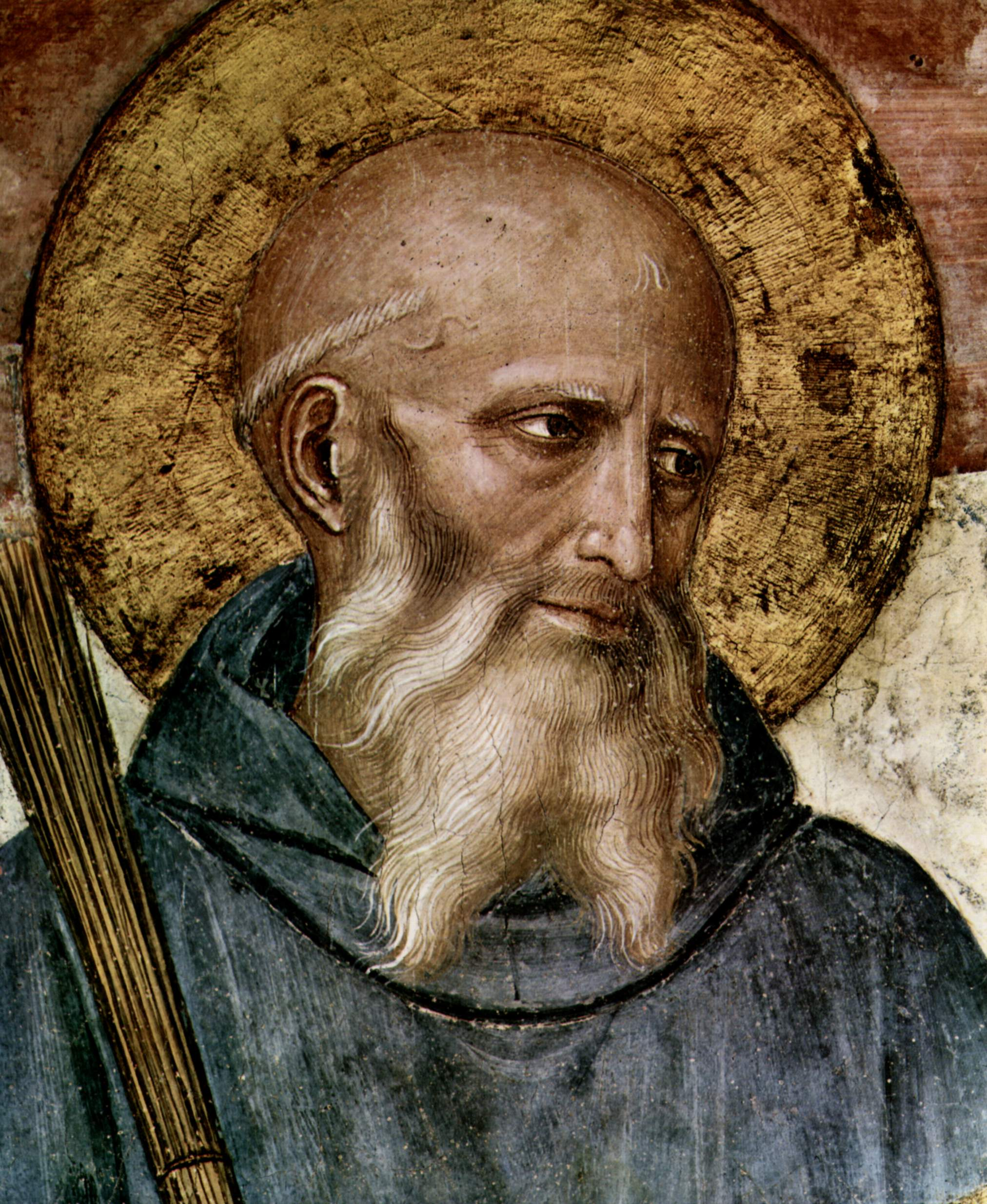
Saint Benedict of Nursia (c. 480–543); detail from a fresco by Fra Angelico (c. 1400–1455) in the Friary of San Marco Florence

The monastery at Subiaco in Italy, established by Benedict of Nursia c. 529, was the first of the dozen monasteries he founded. He later founded the Abbey of Monte Cassino. There is no evidence, however, that he intended to found an order and the Rule of Saint Benedict presupposes the autonomy of each community. When Monte Cassino was sacked by the Lombards about the year 580, the monks fled to Rome, and it seems probable that this constituted an important factor in the diffusion of a knowledge of Benedictine monasticism.

Copies of Benedict's Rule survived; around 594 Pope Gregory I spoke favorably of it. The rule is subsequently found in some monasteries in southern Gaul along with other rules used by abbots. Gregory of Tours says that at Ainay Abbey, in the sixth century, the monks "followed the rules of Basil, Cassian, Caesarius, and other fathers, taking and using whatever seemed proper to the conditions of time and place", and doubtless the same liberty was taken with the Benedictine Rule when it reached them. In Gaul and Switzerland, it gradually supplemented the much stricter Irish or Celtic Rule introduced by Columbanus and others. In many monasteries it eventually entirely displaced the earlier codes.

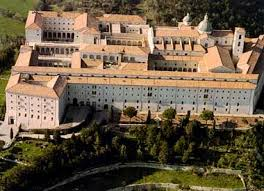
Abbey of Monte Cassino

By the ninth century, however, the Benedictine had become the standard form of monastic life throughout the whole of Western Europe, excepting Scotland, Wales, and Ireland, where the Celtic observance still prevailed for another century or two. Largely through the work of Benedict of Aniane, it became the rule of choice for monasteries throughout the Carolingian empire.

Monastic scriptoria flourished from the ninth through the twelfth centuries. Sacred Scripture was always at the heart of every monastic scriptorium. As a general rule those of the monks who possessed skill as writers made this their chief, if not their sole, active work. An anonymous writer of the ninth or tenth century speaks of six hours a day as the usual task of a scribe, which would absorb almost all the time available for active work in the day of a medieval monk.

In the Middle Ages, monasteries were often founded by the nobility. Cluny Abbey was founded by William I, Duke of Aquitaine, in 910. The abbey was noted for its strict adherence to the Rule of Saint Benedict. The abbot of Cluny was the superior of all the daughter houses, through appointed priors.

One of the earliest reforms of Benedictine practice was that initiated in 980 by Romuald, who founded the Camaldolese community. The Cistercians branched off from the Benedictines in 1098; they are often called the "White monks".

The dominance of the Benedictine monastic way of life began to decline towards the end of the twelfth century, which saw the rise of the mendicant Franciscans and nomadic Dominicans. Benedictines by contrast, took a vow of "stability", which professed loyalty to a particular foundation in a particular location. Not being bound by location, the mendicants were better able to respond to an increasingly "urban" environment. This decline was further exacerbated by the practice of appointing a commendatory abbot, a lay person, appointed by a noble to oversee and to protect the assets of the monastery. Often, however, this resulted in the appropriation of the assets of monasteries at the expense of the community which they were intended to support.

=== Austria and Germany ===
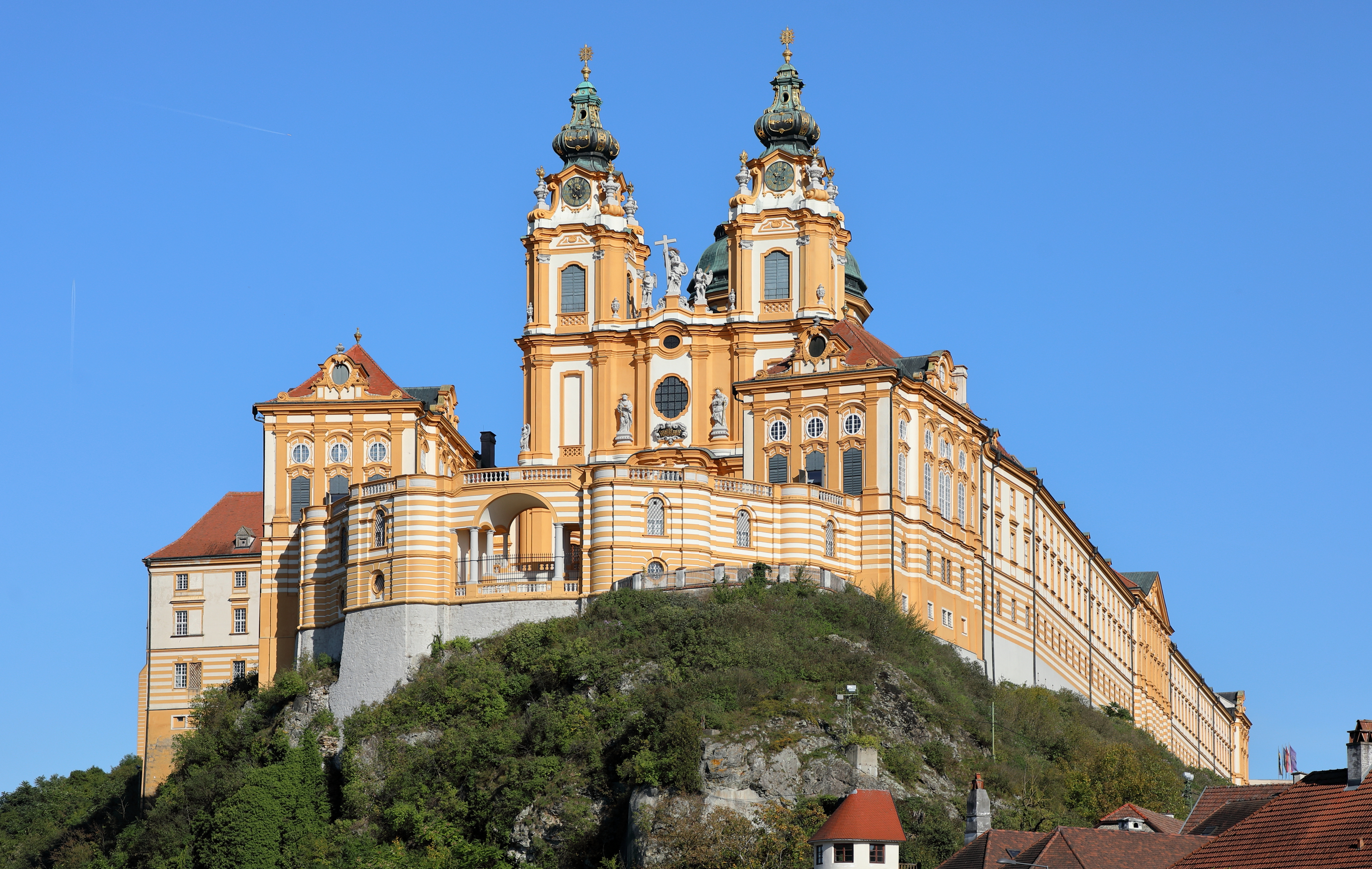
Melk Abbey

Saint Blaise Abbey in the Black Forest of Baden-Württemberg is believed to have been founded around the latter part of the tenth century. Between 1070 and 1073 there seem to have been contacts between St. Blaise and the Cluniac Abbey of Fruttuaria in Italy, which led to St. Blaise following the Fruttuarian reforms. The Empress Agnes was a patron of Fruttuaria, and retired there in 1065 before moving to Rome. The Empress was instrumental in introducing Fruttuaria's Benedictine customs, as practiced at Cluny, to Saint Blaise Abbey in Baden-Württemberg. Other houses either reformed by, or founded as priories of, St. Blasien were Muri Abbey (1082), Ochsenhausen Abbey (1093), Göttweig Abbey (1094), Stein am Rhein Abbey (before 1123) and Prüm Abbey (1132). It also had significant influence on the abbeys of Alpirsbach (1099), Ettenheimmünster (1124) and Sulzburg (c. 1125), and the priories of Weitenau (now part of Steinen, c. 1100), Bürgel (before 1130) and Sitzenkirch (c. 1130).

=== France ===
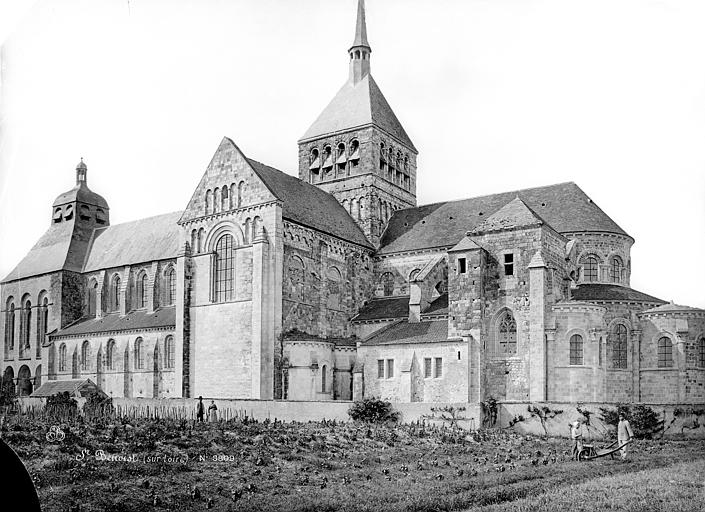
Abbatiale Saint-Benoit, southern aspect as in 1893

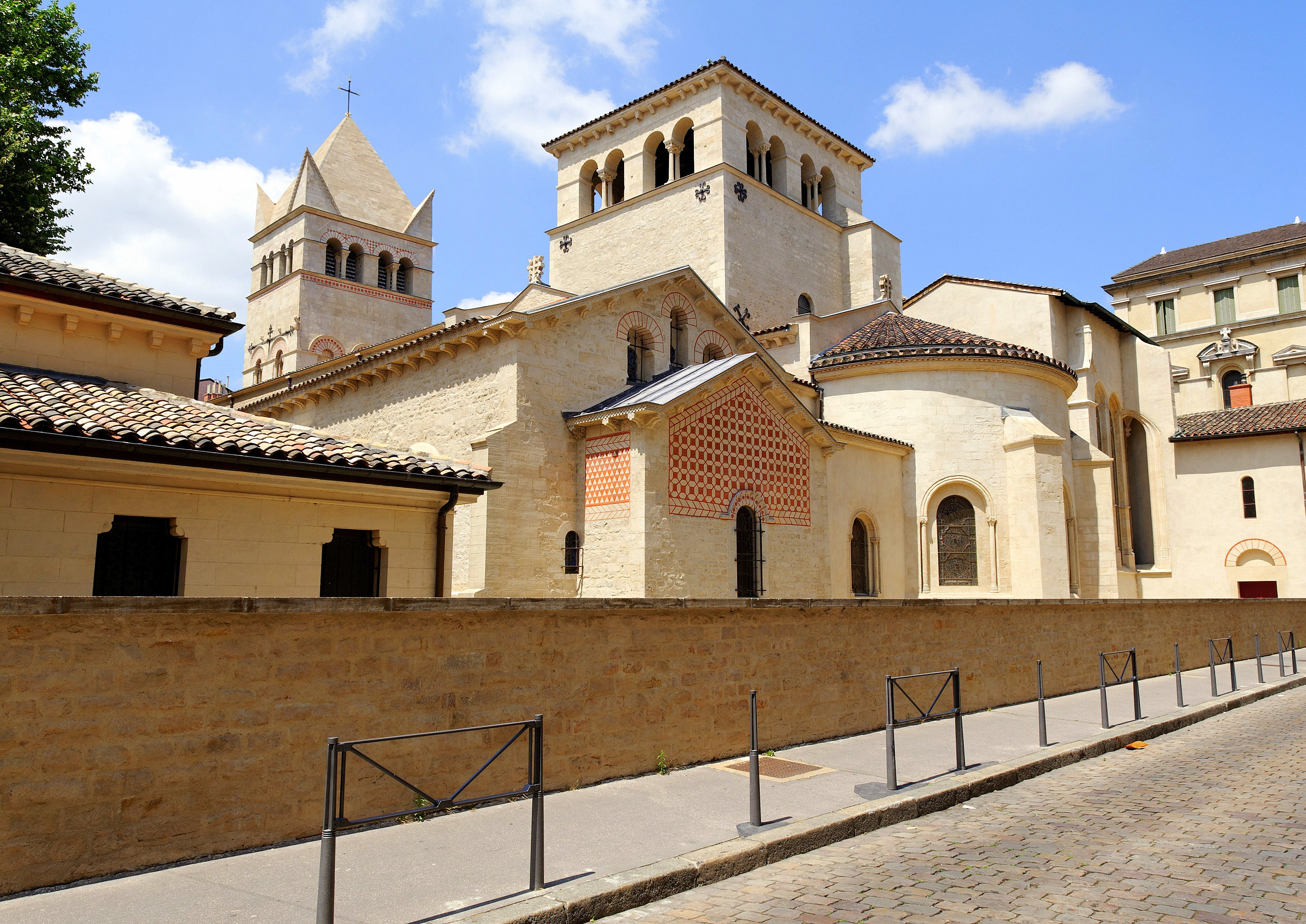
Basilica of Saint-Martin d'Ainay

Fleury Abbey in Saint-Benoît-sur-Loire, Loiret was founded in about 640. It is one of the most celebrated Benedictine monasteries of Western Europe, and possesses the relics of St. Benedict. Like many Benedictine abbeys it was located on the banks of a river, here the Loire. Ainey Abbey is a ninth century foundation on the Lyon peninsula. In the twelfth century on the current site there was a romanesque monastery, subsequently rebuilt.

The seventeenth century saw a number of Benedictine foundations for women, some dedicated to the indigent to save them from a life of exploitation, others dedicated to the Perpetual Adoration of the Blessed Sacrament such as the one established by Catherine de Bar (1614–1698). In 1688 Dame Mechtilde de Bar assisted Marie Casimire Louise de La Grange d'Arquien, queen consort of Poland, to establish a Benedictine foundation in Warsaw.

Abbeys were among the institutions of the Catholic Church swept away during the French Revolution. Monasteries and convents were again allowed to form in the 19th century under the Bourbon Restoration. Later that century, under the Third French Republic, laws were enacted preventing religious teaching. The original intent was to allow secular schools. Thus in 1880 and 1882, Benedictine teaching monks were effectively exiled; this was not completed until 1901.

In 1898 Marie-Adèle Garnier, in religion, Mother Marie de Saint-Pierre, founded a Benedictine house in Montmartre (Mount of the Martyr), in Paris. However, the Waldeck-Rousseau's Law of Associations, passed in 1901, placed severe restrictions on religious bodies which were obliged to leave France. Garnier and her community relocated to another place associated with executions, this time it was in London, near the site of Tyburn tree where 105 Catholic martyrs—including Saint Oliver Plunkett and Saint Edmund Campion had been executed during the English Reformation. A stone's throw from Marble Arch (350 yards (320 m)), the Tyburn Convent is now the Mother House of the Congregation.

=== Poland and Lithuania ===
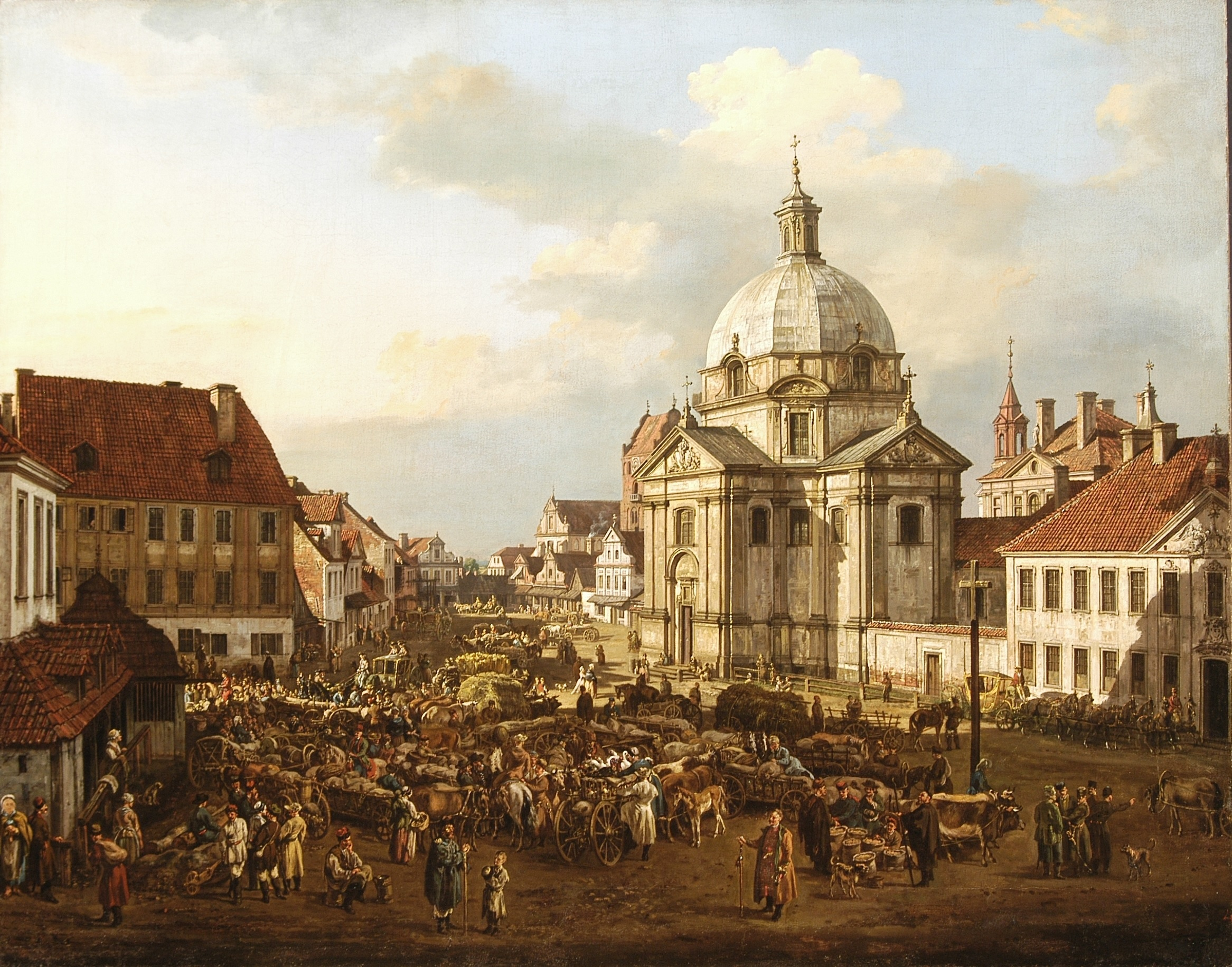
Benedictine church in Warsaw's New Town, depicted by Bellotto

Benedictines are thought to have arrived in the Kingdom of Poland in the 11th-century. One of the earliest foundations is Tyniec Abbey on a promontory by the Vistula river. The Tyniec monks led the translation of the Bible into Polish vernacular. Other surviving Benedictine houses can be found in Stary Kraków Village, Biskupów, Lubiń. Older foundations are in Mogilno, Trzemeszno, Łęczyca, Łysa Góra and in Opactwo, among others. In the Middle Ages the city of Płock, also on the Vistula, had a successful monastery, which played a significant role in the local economy. In the 18th-century benedictine convents were opened for women, notably in Warsaw's New Town.

A 15th-century Benedictine foundation can be found in Senieji Trakai, a village in Eastern Lithuania.

=== Switzerland ===
Kloster Rheinau was a Benedictine monastery in Rheinau in the Canton of Zürich, Switzerland, founded in about 778. Einsiedeln Abbey is a Benedictine monastery in Einsiedeln. The abbey of Our Lady of the Angels was founded in 1120.

=== United Kingdom ===
The English Benedictine Congregation is the oldest of the nineteen Benedictine congregations. Through the influence of Wilfrid, Benedict Biscop, and Dunstan, the Benedictine Rule spread rapidly, and in the North it was adopted in most of the monasteries that had been founded by the Celtic missionaries from Iona. Many of the episcopal sees of England were founded and governed by the Benedictines, and no fewer than nine of the old cathedrals were served by the black monks of the priories attached to them. Monasteries served as hospitals and places of refuge for the weak and homeless. The monks studied the healing properties of plants and minerals to alleviate the sufferings of the sick.

During the English Reformation, all monasteries were dissolved and their lands confiscated by the Crown, forcing those who wished to continue in the monastic life to flee into exile on the Continent. From the middle of the 19th century, Benedictine monasteries and nunneries began to flourish again.

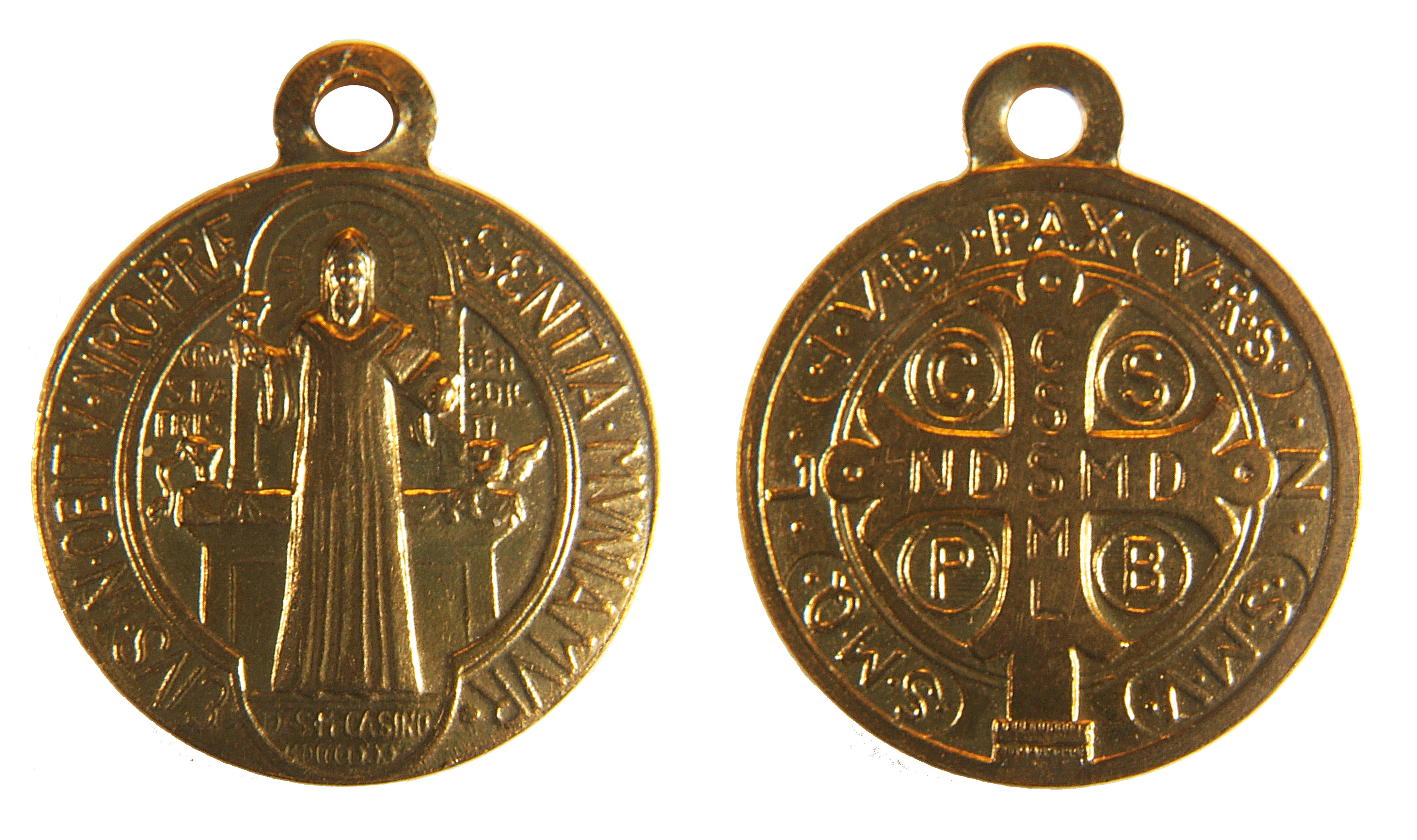
The two sides of a Saint Benedict medal

St. Mildred's Priory, on the Isle of Thanet, Kent, was built in 1027 on the site of an abbey founded in 670 by the daughter of the first Christian King of Kent. Currently the priory is home to a community of Benedictine nuns. Five of the most notable English abbeys are the Basilica of St Gregory the Great at Downside, commonly known as Downside Abbey, The Abbey of St Edmund, King and Martyr commonly known as Douai Abbey in Upper Woolhampton, Reading, Berkshire, Ealing Abbey in Ealing, West London, and Worth Abbey. Prinknash Abbey, used by Henry VIII as a hunting lodge, was officially returned to the Benedictines four hundred years later, in 1928. During the next few years, so-called Prinknash Park was used as a home until it was returned to the order.

St. Lawrence's Abbey in Ampleforth, Yorkshire was founded in 1802. In 1955, Ampleforth set up a daughter house, a priory at St. Louis, Missouri which became independent in 1973 and became Saint Louis Abbey in its own right in 1989.

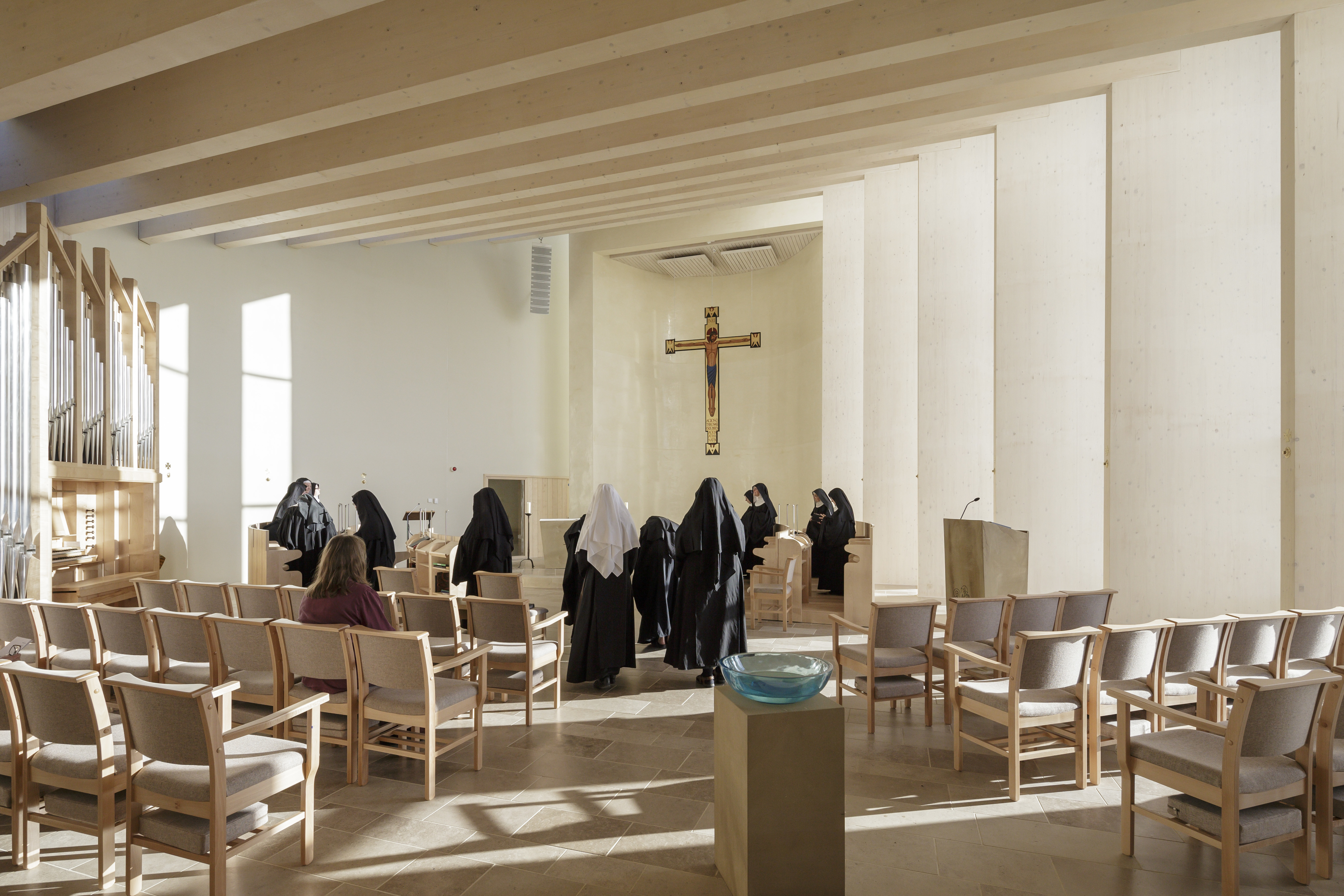
Interior of Stanbrook Abbey Church, Wass, Yorkshire

As of 2015, the English Congregation consists of three abbeys of nuns and ten abbeys of monks. Members of the congregation are found in England, Wales, the United States of America, Peru and Zimbabwe.

In England there are also houses of the Subiaco Cassinese Congregation: Farnborough, Prinknash, and Chilworth: the Solesmes Congregation, Quarr and St Cecilia's on the Isle of Wight, as well as a diocesan monastery following the Rule of Saint Benedict: The Community of Our Lady of Glastonbury.

Since the Oxford Movement, there has also been a modest flourishing of Benedictine monasticism in the Anglican Church and Protestant Churches. Anglican Benedictine Abbots are invited guests of the Benedictine Abbot Primate in Rome at Abbatial gatherings at Sant'Anselmo.

In 1168 local Benedictine monks instigated the anti-semitic blood libel of Harold of Gloucester as a template for explaining child deaths. According to historian Joe Hillaby, the blood libel of Harold was crucially important because for the first time an unexplained child death occurring near the Easter festival was arbitrarily linked to Jews in the vicinity by local Christian churchmen: "they established a pattern quickly taken up elsewhere. Within three years the first ritual murder charge was made in France."

==== Monastic libraries in England ====
The forty-eighth Rule of Saint Benedict prescribes extensive and habitual "holy reading" for the brethren. Three primary types of reading were done by the monks in medieval times. Monks would read privately during their personal time, as well as publicly during services and at mealtimes. In addition to these three mentioned in the Rule, monks would also read in the infirmary. Monasteries were thriving centers of education, with monks and nuns actively encouraged to learn and pray according to the Benedictine Rule. Rule 38 states that 'these brothers' meals should usually be accompanied by reading, and that they were to eat and drink in silence while one read out loud.

Benedictine monks were not allowed worldly possessions, thus necessitating the preservation and collection of sacred texts in monastic libraries for communal use. For the sake of convenience, the books in the monastery were housed in a few different places, namely the sacristy, which contained books for the choir and other liturgical books, the rectory, which housed books for public reading such as sermons and lives of the saints, and the library, which contained the largest collection of books and was typically in the cloister.

The first record of a monastic library in England is in Canterbury. To assist with Augustine of Canterbury's English mission, Pope Gregory the Great gave him nine books which included the Gregorian Bible in two volumes, the Psalter of Augustine, two copies of the Gospels, two martyrologies, an Exposition of the Gospels and Epistles, and a Psalter. Theodore of Tarsus brought Greek books to Canterbury more than seventy years later, when he founded a school for the study of Greek.

=== United States ===
The first Benedictine to live in the United States was Pierre-Joseph Didier. He came to the United States in 1790 from Paris and served in the Ohio and St. Louis areas until his death. The first actual Benedictine monastery founded was Saint Vincent Archabbey, located in Latrobe, Pennsylvania. It was founded in 1832 by Boniface Wimmer, a German monk, who sought to serve German immigrants in America. In 1856, Wimmer started to lay the foundations for St. John's Abbey in Minnesota. In 1876, Herman Wolfe, of Saint Vincent Archabbey established Belmont Abbey in North Carolina. By the time of his death in 1887, Wimmer had sent Benedictine monks to Kansas, New Jersey, North Carolina, Georgia, Florida, Alabama, Illinois, and Colorado.

Wimmer also asked for Benedictine sisters to be sent to America by St. Walburg Convent in Eichstätt, Bavaria. In 1852, Sister Benedicta Riepp and two other sisters founded St. Marys, Pennsylvania. Soon they would send sisters to Michigan, New Jersey, and Minnesota.

By 1854, Swiss monks began to arrive and founded St. Meinrad Abbey in Indiana, and they soon spread to Arkansas and Louisiana. They were soon followed by Swiss sisters.

There are now over 100 Benedictine houses across America. Most Benedictine houses are part of one of four large Congregations: American-Cassinese, Swiss-American, St. Scholastica, and St. Benedict. The congregations mostly are made up of monasteries that share the same lineage. For instance the American-Cassinese congregation included the 22 monasteries descended from Boniface Wimmer.

== Benedictine vows and life ==
A sense of community has been the defining characteristic of the order since the beginning. To that end, section 17 in chapter 58 of the Rule of Saint Benedict specifies the solemn vows candidates joining a Benedictine community are required to make: a vow of stability (to remain in the same community), to adopt a "conversion of habits" (conversatio morum in Latin) and to obey to the community's superior. The "Benedictine vows" are equivalent to the evangelical counsels accepted by all candidates entering a religious order. The interpretation of conversatio morum understood as "conversion of the habits of life" has generally been replaced by notions such as adoption of a monastic manner of life, drawing on the Vulgate's use of conversatio as indicating "citizenship" or "local customs", see Philippians 3:20. The Rule enjoins monks and nuns "to live in this place as a religious, in obedience to its rule and to the abbot or abbess".

Benedictine abbots and abbesses have jurisdiction over their abbey and thus canonical authority over the monks or nuns who are resident. This authority includes the power to assign duties, to decide which books may or may not be read, to regulate comings and goings, and to punish and to excommunicate, in the sense of an enforced isolation from the monastic community.

A tight communal timetable – the horarium – is meant to ensure that the time given by God is not wasted but used in God's service, whether for prayer, work, meals, spiritual reading or sleep. The order's motto is Ora et Labora: "pray and work".

Although Benedictines do not take a vow of silence, hours of strict silence are set, and at other times silence is maintained as much as is practically possible. Social conversations tend to be limited to communal recreation times. Such details, like other aspects of the daily routine of a Benedictine house are left to the discretion of the superior, and are set out in its customary, the code adopted by a particular Benedictine house by adapting the Rule to local conditions.

According to the norms of the 1983 Code of Canon Law, a Benedictine abbey is a "religious institute" and its members therefore participate in consecrated life which Canon 588 §1 explains is intrinsically "neither clerical nor lay." Males in consecrated life, however, may be ordained.

Benedictines' rules contain a reference to ritual purification, which is inspired by Benedict's encouragement of bathing. Benedictine monks have played a role in the development and promotion of spas.

== Organization ==
Benedictine monasticism differs from other Christian religious orders in that as congregations sometimes with several houses, some of them in other countries, they are not bound into a unified religious order headed by a "Superior General". Each Benedictine congregation is autonomous and governed by an abbot or abbess.

The autonomous houses are characterised by their chosen charism or specific dedication to a particular devotion. For example, In 1313 Bernardo Tolomei established the Order of Our Lady of Mount Olivet. The community adopted the Rule of Saint Benedict and received canonical approval in 1344. The Olivetans are part of the Benedictine Confederation. Other specialisms, such as Gregorian chant as at Solesmes in France, or Perpetual Adoration of the Holy Sacrament have been adopted by different houses, as at the Warsaw Convent, or the Adorers of the Sacred Heart of Montmartre at Tyburn Convent in London. Other houses have dedicated themselves to books, reading, writing and printing them as at Stanbrook Abbey in England. Others still are associated with the places where they were founded or their founders centuries ago, hence Cassinese, Subiaco, Camaldolese or Sylvestrines.

All Benedictine houses became federated in the Benedictine Confederation brought into existence by Pope Leo XIII's Apostolic Brief "Summum semper" on 12 July 1893. Pope Leo also established the office of Abbot Primate as the abbot elected to represent this Confederation at the Vatican and to the world. The headquarters of the Benedictine Confederation and the Abbot Primate is the Primatial Abbey of Sant'Anselmo built by Pope Leo XIII in Rome.

== Other orders ==
The Rule of Saint Benedict is also used by a number of religious orders that began as reforms of the Benedictine tradition such as the Cistercians and Trappists. These groups are separate congregations and not members of the Benedictine Confederation.

Although most Benedictines are Catholic, there are also other communities that follow the Rule of Saint Benedict. For example, of an estimated 2,400 celibate Anglican religious (1,080 men and 1,320 women) in the Anglican Communion as a whole, some have adopted the Rule of Benedict. Likewise, such communities can be found in the Eastern Orthodox Church, and the Lutheran Church.

== Notable Benedictines ==
Individuals are arranged in chronological order by date of death if deceased, and by date of birth if alive.

	Male	Female
Saints	Benedict of Nursia (2 March 480 – 21 March 547), Founder of the Order and Patron Saint of Europe; Maurus of Subiaco (c. 512– 15 Jan 584), first disciple of St. Benedict, famous for rescuing of St. Placidus from drowning.; Placidus of Subiaco (c. 6th century) disciple of St. Benedict.; Lawrence of Canterbury (died 2 February 619), the second Archbishop of Canterbury; Mellitus (died 24 April 624), the third Archbishop of Canterbury; Justus (died on 10 November between 627 and 631), the fourth Archbishop of Canterbury; Paulinus of York (died 10 October 644), the first Bishop of York; Cuthbert of Lindisfarne (c. 634 – 20 March 687), the sixth bishop of Lindisfarne; Benedict Biscop (c. 628 – 12 January 690), founder of Monkwearmouth-Jarrow Priory; Erkenwald (c. 630 – c. 693), Bishop of London; Wilfrid (c. 633 – c. 709), Bishop of York; Bertin (c. 615 – c. 709), abbot of a monastery in Saint-Omer later named the Abbey of Saint Bertin; Aldhelm (c. 639 – 25 May 709), Abbot of Malmesbury Abbey, Bishop of Sherborne, and a writer and scholar of Latin poetry; Rupert of Salzburg (c. 660 – 27 March 710), Bishop of Worms as well as the first Bishop of Salzburg; Swidberth of Kaiserwerdt (died c. 713), who accompanied Willibrord on the Anglo-Saxon mission; John of Beverley (died 7 May 721), Bishop of York; Leudwinus (c. 660 – 29 September 722), Count of Treves who later became Archbishop of Treves and Laon; Bede the Venerable (672/3 – 26 May 735), scholar, "The Father of English History" and Doctor of the Church; Willibrord c. 658 – 7 November 739), Bishop of Utrecht and "Apostle to the Frisians"; Boniface (c. 675 – 5 June 754), Bishop of Mainz, Apostle to the Germans and martyr of the Anglo-Saxon missions; Wilfrido della Gherardesca (died 15 February 756), monk; Sturm of Fulda (c. 705 – 17 December 779), disciple of Boniface and founder and first abbot of the Benedictine monastery and abbey of Fulda; Benedict of Aniane (747 – 12 February 821), "The Second Benedict"; Adalard of Corbie c. 751 – 2 January 827), Abbot of Corbie; Rabanus Maurus (c. 780 – 4 February 856), Archbishop of Mainz and "The Teacher of Germany"; Swithun (c. 800 - 2 July 863), Bishop of Winchester; Paschasius Radbertus (c. 785 – c. 865), abbot of Corbie; Ansgar (8 September 801 – 3 February 865), Archbishop of Hamburg-Bremen and "Apostle of the North"; Altfrid von Hildesheim (died 15 August 874), Bishop of Hildesheim, and founder of Essen Abbey; Hincmar (806 – 21 December 882), Archbishop of Reims; Bertario di Montecassino (c. 810 - 22 October 883), abbot and martyr; Berno of Cluny (c. 850 – 13 January 927), the first abbot of Cluny and began the tradition of the Cluniac reforms; Odo of Cluny (c. 878 – 18 November 942), the second abbot of Cluny; Oda of Canterbury (died 2 June 958), the twenty-third Archbishop of Canterbury; Aymard of Cluny (died c. 965), the third abbot of Cluny; Æthelwold of Winchester (between 904 and 909 - 1 August 984), Bishop of Winchester; Dunstan (c. 909 – 19 May 988), Archbishop of Canterbury; Majolus of Cluny (c. 906 – 11 May 994), the fourth abbot of Cluny; Wolfgang of Regensburg (c. 934 – 31 October 994), Bishop of Regensburg; Adalbert of Prague (c. 956 – 23 April 997), missionary Bishop of Prague and martyr; Attilanus (c. 937 – c. 1007), Bishop of Zamora and prior of Moreruela Abbey; Andrew Zorard (c. 980 - c. 1009), monk; Benedict of Skalka (died c. 1012), monk and martyr; Simeon of Mantua (died 1016), hermit; Emperor Henry II (6 May 973 – 13 July 1024), Holy Roman Emperor and oblate of the order; Bononio of Lucedio (died 30 August 1026), Abbot of Lucedio; Romuald (c. 951 - 19 June 1027), founder of the Camaldolese Order; William of Volpiano (June/July 962 - 1 January 1031), Cluniac reformer, architect, musician, and abbot of numerous houses; Guido da Pomposa (c. 970 - 31 March 1046), Abbot of Pomposa; Gerard of Csanád (23 April 977/1000 – 24 September 1046), Bishop of Csanád and martyr; Odilo of Cluny (c. 962 – c. 1 January 1049), the fifth abbot of Cluny; Alferio (c. 930 - 12 April 1050), founder of the Abbey of La Trinità della Cava and became its first abbot; Íñigo of Oña (c. 1000 - 1 June 1057) Abbot of San Salvador at Oña; Pier Damiani, also known as Peter Damian, (c. 1007 – 21 or 22 February 1072 or 1073), Cardinal and Doctor of the Church; Giovanni Gualberto (c. 985 – 12 July 1073), founder of the Vallumbrosan Order; Maurus of Pécs (c. 1000 – c. 1075), Bishop of Pécs; Pope Gregory VII (c. 1015 – 25 May 1085), Bishop of Rome; Arnulf of Soissons (c. 1040 - c. 1087), Bishop of Soissons and founder of the Abbey of St. Peter in Oudenburg; Leone I (died 1079), second abbot of La Trinità della Cava; Wulfstan of Worcester (c. 1008 – 20 January 1095), Bishop of Worcester; Alberto da Prezzate (or da Pontida) (c. 1025 - 2 September 1095), abbot; Walter of Pontoise (c. 1030 – c. 1099), abbot of Pontoise; Pietro de Anagni (died 3 August 1105), Bishop of Anagni and papal legate; Anselm of Canterbury (c. 1033 – 21 April 1109), Archbishop of Canterbury and Doctor of the Church; Hugh of Cluny (13 May 1024 – 29 April 1109), Abbot of Cluny and one of the most influential leaders of the monastic orders from the Middle Ages; Lidanus (c. 1026 - c. 1118), founder of Sezze Abbey; Pietro di Pappacarbone (died 4 March 1123), third abbot of La Trinità della Cava; Bruno di Segni (c. 1045 – 18 July 1123), Bishop of Segni and Abbot of Montecassino, Constabile (c. 1070 – 17 February 1124), fourth abbot of La Trinità della Cava; William of Montevergine (c. 1085 – 25 June 1142), founder of the Congregation of Monte Vergine, or "Williamites"; Ernest (died c. 1148), abbot of Zwiefalten Abbey; Étienne d'Obazine (c. 1085 – 8 March 1159), hermit; Franco da Assergi (c. 1154 or 1159 - 12th century), hermit; Rinaldo di Nocera (c. 1150 - 9 February 1217), Bishop of Nocera Umbra; Edmund Rich of Abingdon (perhaps 20 November c. 1174 - 16 November 1240); Silvestro Gozzolini (c. 1177 – 26 November 1267), founder of the Sylvestrine Order; Pope Celestine V (1209/1210 or 1215 – 19 May 1296), Bishop of Rome and founder of the now-extinct Celestine Order; Bernardo Tolomei (10 May 1272 – 20 August 1348), founder of the Olivetan Order; John Roberts (c. 1577 – 10 December 1610), martyred during the English Reformation and one of the Forty Martyrs of England and Wales; Ambrose Barlow (before 30 November 1585 – 10 September 1641), martyred during the English Reformation and one of the Forty Martyrs of England and Wales; Alban Roe ((20 July 1583 – 21 January 1642), martyred during the English Reformation and one of the Forty Martyrs of England and Wales; Oliver Plunkett (1 November 1625 – 1 July 1681), Archbishop of Armagh and Primate of All Ireland and oblate of the order, victim of Titus Oates' "Popish Plot"	Scholastica (c. 480 – 10 February 543), sister of Saint Benedict and traditionally the founder of the Benedictine nuns; Æthelthryth (c. 636 – 23 June 679), Abbess of Ely; Hilda of Whitby (c. 614 – 17 November 680), virgin and abbess; Werburh (c. 650 - 3 February 700), princess who later became a nun; Mildrith (c. 660 - after 732), abbess of the Abbey at Minster-in-Thanet; Walpurga (c. 710 – 25 February 777 or 779), Anglo-Saxon missionary to the Frankish Empire; Wiborada of St. Gall (died c. 926), anchoress and martyr; Edith of Wilton (c. 961 – c. 984), the daughter of Edgar, King of England (r. 959–975) and Saint Wulfthryth, who later became a nun together with her mother and retired to Wilton Abbey; Wulfthryth of Wilton (c. 937 – 21 September c. 1000), the mother of Edith of Wilton and the second known consort of Edgar, King of England and later became abbess of Wilton Abbey; Adelaide of Vilich (c. 970 – 5 February 1015), abbess; Cunigunde of Luxembourg (c. 975 – 3 March 1033), Holy Roman Empress; Hildegard of Bingen (c. 1098 – 17 September 1179), abbess and Doctor of the Church; Mechtilde of Hackeborn (c. 1240 or 1241 – 19 November 1298), nun; Gertrude the Great (6 January 1256 – 17 November 1302), mystic who was a member of the Monastery of Helfta; Frances of Rome (c. 1384 – 9 March 1440), Patroness of Benedictine Oblates; Benedetta Cambiagio Frassinello (2 October 1791 - 21 March 1858), founder of the Benedictine Sisters of Providence
Blessed	Alcuin (c. 735 – 19 May 804), a leading scholar and teacher at the Carolingian court, declared Blessed by popular acclaim; Utto of Metten (died 3 October 829), first abbot of Metten Abbey; Notker the Stammerer (c. 840 – 6 April 912), composer, poet and scholar; Hermann of Reichenau (18 July 1013 – 24 September 1054), the possible composer of "Salve Regina", "Veni Sancte Spiritus", and "Alma Redemptoris Mater", beatified in 1863; Pope Victor III (c. 1026 – 16 September 1087), Bishop of Rome; Lanfranc (c. 1005 or 1010 – 24 May 1089), Archbishop of Canterbury; William of Hirsau (c. 1030 – 5 July 1091), abbot of Hirsau Abbey and father of the Hirsau Reforms; Robert of Arbrissel (c. 1045 – c. 1116), founder of Fontevraud Abbey; Simeone (died 16 November 1140), fifth abbot of La Trinità della Cava; Falcone (died 6 June 1140), sixth abbot of La Trinità della Cava; Berthold de Rachez of Garsten (c. 1060 – 27 July 1142), monk; Rupert von Ottobeuren (died 15 August 1145), prior; Peter the Venerable (c. 1092 – 25 December 1156), the ninth abbot of Cluny; Marino (died 15 December 1170), seventh abbot of La Trinità della Cava; Giovanni de Surdis Cacciafronte (c. 1125 - 16 March 1184), Bishop of Vicenza and martyr; Pietro Acotanto (died 23 September 1187), monk; Benincasa (died 10 January 1194), eighth abbot of La Trinità della Cava; Pietro II (died 13 March 1208), tenth abbot of La Trinità della Cava; Balsamo (died 24 November 1232), eleventh abbot of La Trinità della Cava; Conrad of Ottobeuren (died 27 July 1227), Abbot of Ottobeuren Abbey; the Benedictine prior of Avignonet (whose name is unknown) (died 28 May 1242), inquisitor martyred at Avignonet in a mission to eradicate the Cathar heresy; Giordano Forzate (c. 1158 - 7 August 1248), monk; Leonardo (died 18 August 1255), twelfth abbot of La Trinità della Cava; Leone II (c. 1239 - 19 August 1295), sixteenth abbot of La Trinità della Cava; Pope Urban V (c. 1310 – 19 December 1370), Bishop of Rome; Hugh Cook Faringdon (died 14 November 1539), the last Abbot of Reading Abbey, martyred during the English Reformation; John Rugg (died 14 November 1539), martyred alongside Abbot Hugh Faringdon during the English Reformation; John Eynon (died 14 November 1539), martyred alongside Abbot Hugh Faringdon during the English Reformation; Richard Whiting (c. 1461 – 15 November 1539), the last Abbot of Glastonbury Abbey, martyred during the English Reformation; John Thorne and Roger James (died 15 November 1539), martyred alongside Abbot Richard Whiting during the English Reformation; John Beche (died 1 December 1539), the last Abbot of Colchester Abbey, martyred during the English Reformation; Mark Barkworth (c. 1572 - 27 February 1601), martyred during the English Reformation; George Gervase (c. 1571 - 11 April 1608), martyred during the English Reformation; William (Maurus) Scott (c. 1579 - 30 May 1612), martyred during the English Reformation; Philip Powell (Morgan) (2 February 1594 – 30 June 1646), martyred during the English Reformation; Thomas Pickering (c. 1621 - 9 May 1679), martyred during the English Reformation as a victim of Titus Oates' "Popish Plot"; Louis Barreau de la Touche (6 June 1758 – 2 September 1792), martyr of the French Revolution; Ambroise-Augustin Chevreux (13 February 1728 – 2 September 1792), martyr of the French Revolution; René-Julien Massey (c. 1732 – 2 September 1792), martyr of the French Revolution; Claude Richard (19 May 1741 - 9 August 1794), martyr of the French Revolution; Louis-Francois Lebrun (4 April 1744 - 20 August 1794), martyr of the French Revolution; Giuseppe Benedetto Dusmet (15 August 1818 - 14 April 1894), Archbishop of Catania and Cardinal; Tommaso (Placido) Riccardi (24 June 1844 - 25 March 1915), priest; Joseph (Columba) Marmion (1 April 1858 - 30 January 1923), Irish priest; Abel Ángel (Mauro) Palazuelos Maruri and 17 Companions (died between 26 July to 28 August 1936), Martyrs of the Spanish Civil War from El Pueyo; José Antón Gómez and 3 Companions (died between 25 September to 31 December 1936), Martyrs of the Spanish Civil War from Madrid; Jaume (Bernat) Vendrell Olivella and 19 Companions, (died between 25 July 1936 to 15 February 1937), Martyrs of the Spanish Civil War from the Archdiocese of Tarragona; Alfredo Ildefonso Schuster (18 January 1880 – 30 August 1954), Cardinal Archbishop of Milan	Irmgard of Chiemsee (c. 831 or 833 – 16 July 866), nun; Gisela of Hungary (c. 985 – 7 May 1065), the first queen consort of Hungary by marriage to Saint Stephen I of Hungary; Beatrice I d'Este (c. 1192 – 10 May 1226), nun; Beatrice II d'Este (c. 1230 – 18 January 1262), nun; Giuliana di Collalto (c. 1186 – 1 September 1262), nun; Giustina Francucci Bezzoli (c. 1260 - 12 March 1319), professed religious; Eustochio (Lucrezia) Bellini di Padova (c. 1444 - 13 February 1469), professed religious; Giovanna Maria Bonomo (15 August 1606 - 1 March 1670), professed religious; Rosalie du Verdier de la Sorniere (12 August 1745 - 27 January 1794), martyr of the French Revolution from the Benedictine Nuns of Our Lady of Calvary; Suzanne-Agathe (Marie Rose) Deloye (4 February 1741 - 6 July 1794), martyr of the French Revolution; Gertrude (Maria Luisa Angelica) Prosperi (19 August 1799 - 13 September 1847), professed religious; Maria Adeodata Pisani (29 December 1806 - 25 February 1855), professed religious; Anna Felicia (Maria Fortunata) Viti (10 February 1827 - 20 November 1922), professed religious; Colomba Gabriel (3 May 1858 - 24 September 1926), Ukrainian founder of the Benedictine Sisters of Charity; Maria della Trinità (Itala Mela) (28 August 1904 – 29 April 1957), virgin and oblate of the order; Hanna Helena Chrzanowska (7 October 1902 – 29 April 1973), nurse and oblate of the order
Venerables	Jean-Baptiste Delaveyne (11 September 1653 - 5 June 1719), founder of the Sisters of Charity and Christian Instruction; Josef Gebhard (Meinrad) Eugster (23 August 1848 - 14 June 1925), Swiss priest; Bernardo Vaz Lobo Teixeira de Vasconcelos (of the Annunciation) (7 July 1902 - 4 July 1932), Spanish priest	Isabella Tomasi (Maria Crocifissa of the Conception) (29 May 1645 - 16 October 1699), professed religious; Giustina Schiapparoli (19 July 1819 - 30 November 1877), founder of the Benedictine Sisters of Divine Providence; Maria Antonia Schiapparoli (19 April 1815 - 2 May 1882), founder of the Benedictine Sisters of Divine Providence; Luigia Lavizzari (Maria Caterina of the Child Jesus) (6 October 1867 - 25 December 1931), professed religious of the Benedictine Nuns of the Perpetual Adoration of the Blessed Sacrament; Jadwiga Jaroszewska (Wincenta of the Passion of the Lord) (7 March 1900 - 10 November 1937), founder of the Benedictine Samaritan Sisters of the Cross of Christ
Servants of God	Błażej Pęcharek (Bernard of Wąbrzeźno) (3 February 1575 – 2 June 1603), Polish priest; Pope Pius VII (14 August 1742 – 20 August 1823), Bishop of Rome; Jean-Baptiste Muard (24 April 1809 – 19 June 1854), founder of the Society of Saint Edmund; Prosper Guéranger (4 April 1805 – 30 January 1875), Abbot of Solesmes Abbey; Leonard (Marinus) LaRue (14 January 1914 - 14 October 2001), American priest	Magdalena Mortęska (2 December 1554 – 15 February 1631), abbess; Mechtilde de Bar (31 December 1614 – 6 April 1698), founder of the Benedictine Nuns of Perpetual Adoration of the Blessed Sacrament; Adèle Garnier (1838–1924)
Other notable persons	Popes: Pope Sylvester II (c. 946–1003, r. 999–1003); Pope Paschal II (d. 1118, r. 1099–1118); Pope Gelasius II (d. 1119, r. 1118–1119); Pope Clement VI (1291–1352, r. 1342–1352); Pope Gregory XVI (1765–1846, r. 1831–1846); Cardinals and bishops: Adam Easton (d. 1397); Gabriel Gifford (1554–1629), archbishop; Michael Ellis (1652–1726), bishop; Charles Walmesley (1722–1797), bishop; William Placid Morris (1794–1872), bishop; John Bede Polding (1794–1877), archbishop; William Bernard Ullathorne (1806–1889), bishop; Jean-Baptiste-François Pitra (1812–1889), cardinal; Roger Vaughan (1834–1883), archbishop; Martin Marty (1834–1896), bishop; Guglielmo Sanfelice d'Acquavilla (1834–1897), cardinal; John Hedley (1837–1915), bishop; Domenico Serafini (1852–1918), cardinal; Francis Aidan Gasquet (1846–1929), cardinal; Knut Ansgar Nelson (1906–1990), bishop; Basil Hume (1923–1999), cardinal; Hans Hermann Groër (1919–2003), cardinal; Paul Augustin Mayer (1911–2010), cardinal; Placidus Nkalanga (1918–2015), bishop; Daniel M. Buechlein (1938–2018), archbishop; Rembert Weakland (1927–2022), archbishop; Jerome Hanus (1940–), archbishop; Godfrey Mullen (1966- ), bishop; Monastic leaders: Jonas of Bobbio (600–659), abbot; Suger (c. 1081–1151), abbot; John Whethamstede (d. 1465), abbot; Johannes Trithemius (1462–1516), abbot; Laurent Bénard (1573–1620), founder of the Maurists; Mariano Armellino (1657–1737), abbot; Antoine Augustin Calmet (1672–1757), abbot; Boniface Wimmer (1809–1887), archabbot; Maurus Wolter (1825–1890), abbot; Joseph Pothier (1835–1923), abbot; Andreas Amrhein (1844–1927), founder of the Ottilien Congregation; John Chapman (1865–1933), abbot; Edward Cuthbert Butler (1858–1934), abbot; Henri Quentin (1872–1935), abbot; Fernand Cabrol (1855–1937), abbot; Anscar Vonier (1875–1938), abbot; Scholars: Guido of Arezzo (991–1050); Paul the Deacon (c. 720–799); Eadmer (c. 1060 – c. 1126); Florence of Worcester (d. 1118); Symeon of Durham (d. 1130); Jocelyn de Brakelond (d. 1211); Matthew Paris (c. 1200 – 1259); William of Malmesbury (c. 1095 – c. 1143); Gervase of Canterbury (c. 1141 – c. 1210); Roger of Wendover (d. 1236); Peter the Deacon (d. 1140); Honoré Bonet (c. 1340 – c. 1410); John Lydgate (c. 1370 – c. 1451); Louis de Blois (1506–1566); Sigebert Buckley (c. 1520 – c. 1610); Benedictus van Haeften (1588–1648); Augustine Baker (1575–1641); Anthony Batt (d. 1651); Jean Mabillon (1632–1707); Magnoald Ziegelbauer (1689–1750); Marquard Herrgott (1694–1762); Pietro Luigi Galletti (1724–1790); Luigi Tosti (1811–1897); Oswald William Moosmuller (1842–1901); Suitbert Bäumer (1845–94); Germain Morin (1861–1946); Lambert Beauduin (1873–1960); Bede Griffiths (1906–1993); Willigis Jäger (1925–2020); Anselm Grün (1945–); Oblates: Joris-Karl Huysmans (1848–1907); Romano Guardini (1885–1968); Jacques Maritain (1882–1973); Walker Percy (1916–1990)	Abbesses: Alice Henley (died 1470), abbess; Magdalena Mortęska (1554–1631), abbess; Catherine Gascoigne (1601–1676), abbess; Laurentia McLachlan (1866–1953), abbess; Scholars: Gertrude More (1606–1633); Barbara Constable (1617–1674); Werburg Welch (1898–1990); Felicitas Corrigan (1908–2003); Hildelith Cumming (1909–1990); Mary Boulding (1929–2009); Mary O'Hara (1935–); Thomas Welder (1940–2020); Joan Chittister (1936–); Noella Marcellino (1951–); Teresa Forcades (1966–); Oblates: Dorothy Day (1897–1980); Kathleen Norris (1947–)

== See also ==
- Dom Pierre Pérignon
- Benedictine Confederation
- Catholic religious order
- Cistercians
- French Romanesque architecture
- Sisters of Social Service
- Trappists
- St Benedict Patron of Europe Association
- Abbey of Baume-les-Dames
