= Gertrude Prosperi =

Italian Benedictine (1799–1847)

Blessed Gertrude Prosperi OSB
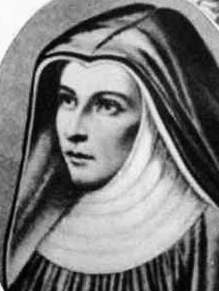

Virgin
- Born: 19 August 1799; Fogliano di Cascia, Perugia, Roman Republic
- Died: 13 September 1847 (aged 48); Trevi, Perugia, Papal States
- Venerated in: Roman Catholic Church
- Beatified: 10 November 2012, Cathedral of Santa Maria Assunta, Perugia, Italy by Cardinal Angelo Amato
- Feast: 12 September

Gertrude Prosperi (19 August 1799 – 13 September 1847) was an Italian Benedictine. Prosperi assumed the religious name Maria Luisa Angelica and finally served as the abbess of her convent for an extended period of time until her death.

Prosperi recounted that she experienced a series of angelic visions in which she witnessed the Passion of Jesus Christ and she began to feel tremendous pain while continuing to experience a range of visions and emotions brought on due to these things. She was well known among her peers for strict observance to the Rule of Saint Benedict of Nursia and for her ardent devotion to both the Sacred Heart of Jesus and to the Eucharist.

Her cause for sainthood commenced prior to the onslaught of World War I and was cut short due to the conflict but was revitalized decades later and culminated when Pope Benedict XVI approved a miracle needed for her to be beatified; Cardinal Angelo Amato - on the pope's behalf - presided over the beatification in Perugia on 10 November 2012.

== Life ==
Gertrude Prosperi was born on 19 August 1799 in Perugia to Dominic Prosperi and Maria Diomedi. She was baptized right after she was born in the parish church of Saint Hippolytus. She had a stable Christian upbringing and Prosperi became inspired in the Christian example that a maternal aunt possessed.

Prosperi felt called to the religious life after a period of deep contemplation and in order to fulfill her desire she entered the Order of Saint Benedict through the convent of Santa Lucia in Trevi on 4 May 1820 and assumed the religious name of "Maria Luisa Angelica" upon her solemn profession after she completed her novitiate. After this she served as a nurse as well as a novice mistress and was appointed as the abbess of the Santa Lucia convent on 1 October 1837; Prosperi went on to hold that position until her death.

Prosperi had an intense devotion to the Eucharist in addition to her ardent devotion to the Sacred Heart of Jesus - the latter which spouted from her vision pertaining to the Sacred Heart. She was known among her peers for her strict observance to the Rule of Saint Benedict of Nursia and for her persistent revitalization of the Rule's importance upon its members.

During her life she said that she received a vision of Jesus Christ as he carried the cross in addition to a vision of the Sacred Heart and that she also experienced a vision in which Christ was a pilgrim. For a period of five years the spiritual director and Bishop of Spoleto (and future cardinal) Ignazio Giovanni Cadolini guided her in discerning the truth of her visions and being able to differentiate between visions and the work of Satan. On the pain of the Passion of Christ that she felt Prosperi said: "Oh God, what pain!"

Her health took on a rapid downfall in 1847 and grew worse during Holy Week. The evening before Palm Sunday saw her suffocate after a period of illness though she recovered from that but was confined to bed by Holy Thursday, unable to move and with strong pains. Easter saw her health improve but it declined not long after with a high fever and a series of painful headaches. In August 1847 she didn't get out of her bed that much but was able to move. Prosperi died on 13 September 1847 - as she wanted, in a cruciform posture - and was buried in the church of Santa Lucia in Trevi. Her writings were left preserved and were copied when her Jesuit confessor Father Paterniani wrote the first chronicle of her life in 1870.

== Beatification ==
The process for beatification commenced in the Diocese of Spoleto-Norcia on 6 July 1914 - under Pope Pius X - in which documentation and her writings would be collated to ascertain how she exercised the virtues to a favourable degree; the beginning of the process saw her being granted the posthumous title of Servant of God - the first stage in the sainthood process. The cause was suspended for a brief period of time during World War I but resumed at the war's end and concluded its business on 16 August 1921. What followed was several decades of inaction and suspension but ended when the cause was reopened on 13 December 1987.

Another process was held in the same diocese to continue the work of the first process before a diocesan tribunal that spanned from 23 October 1991 until its closure less than a couple of months later on 13 December 1991. At this point the Congregation for the Causes of Saints - under Pope John Paul II - granted their assent at the continuation of the cause with the declaration of "nihil obstat" (nothing against) on 8 February 1992 thus re-confirming the title Servant of God upon Prosperi.

The two processes that had been held before then received formal ratification from Rome on 27 January 1995 and would allow for the Congregation for the Causes of Saints to begin its own line of investigation in what would be the so-called "Roman Phase". The postulation compiled the Positio - documenting biographical details and her use of the virtues - and submitted it to Rome for further evaluation in two parts in 1998 and in 2000. In the interregnum between depositing the Positio a historical commission had to meet to see if there were obstacles to the progression of the cause. After meeting on 26 October 1999 the historians agreed the cause had no impediments and could thus proceed.

On 1 July 2010 she was declared to be Venerable after Pope Benedict XVI acknowledged the fact that Prosperi had indeed lived a model Christian life of heroic virtue which he deemed that she had exercised well to a favorable degree to that which was required of the cause to assess.

The miracle needed for her beatification - the curing of a woman from Umbria of a brain-related illness - was investigated in the diocese of origin in a process that spanned from 16 December 2002 until 12 March 2005; it collected witness testimonies and medical assessments. The Congregation for the Causes of Saints approved the process on 2 June 2007 and assumed control of the next stage of investigating the miracle. Benedict XVI approved the healing as being a miracle attributed to her intercession on 19 December 2011 and allowed for her beatification to take place.

Her beatification was celebrated in Perugia on 10 November 2012 - Cardinal Angelo Amato presided over the liturgical celebration on the behalf of the pontiff. The postulator assigned to the cause is Andrea Ambrosi.
