= Oswald William Moosmuller =

Bavarian Benedictine monk and author

Oswald William Moosmuller (February 26, 1832 – January 10, 1901) was a noted Benedictine monk and author. He was born in Aidling, Bavaria, in 1832.

He entered the novitiate of the Benedictine Order, and was sent to the United States in 1852. He was ordained a priest of the Roman Catholic Church in 1856. From 1859 through 1861, he served as a missionary in Brazil. He was then assigned to become the superior of monastery in Sandwich, Ontario. He remained in that position through 1863, when he became the prior of St. Mary's Church in Newark, New Jersey. He left that position to become the procurator of his order and the director of St. Elizabeth Seminary in Rome. He was then assigned to the prior and treasurer of St. Vincent Abbey, until he was, in 1874, assigned to be the superior of St. Benedict Abbey in Atchison, Kansas. From 1892 through 1901, he organized and later headed the new Abbey of Cluny in Wetaug, Illinois. He was the author of the books St. Vincenz in Pennsylvanien (1873) and Bonifaz Wimmer von St. Vincent in Pennsylvanien in 1901. He also wrote several articles in English and German language newspapers on the Benedictine order in the United States. He died at Cluny Monastery in 1901.
