= Suitbert Bäumer =

Benedictine monk, historian and patrologist

Suitbert Bäumer (28 March 1845 – 12 August 1894) was a Benedictine monk and historian of the Breviary and a patrologist of the nineteenth century.

== Biography ==
He was born at Haus Leuchtenberg, Kaiserswerth, in the Lower Rhine region of Germany. He studied at the universities of Bonn and Tübingen; in 1865 he entered the Benedictine Beuron Archabbey, then newly founded, and was ordained priest in 1869.

He spent the years 1875–90 at Maredsous Abbey in Belgium and at Erdington in England; in the latter year he returned to Beuron. Bäumer was long the critical adviser of the printing house of Desclée, Lefebvre and associates at Tournai, for their editions of the Missal, Breviary, Ritual, Pontifical, and other liturgical works.

He contributed a number of essays to reviews, e.g. on the Stowe Missal (the oldest liturgical record of the Irish Church) in the Zeitschrift für katholische Theologie (1892), on the author of the "Micrologus" (an important medieval liturgical treatise) in "Neues Archiv" (1893), on the "Sacramentarium Gelasianum" in the "Historisches Jahrbuch" (1893).

He also wrote a life of Mabillon (1892) and a treatise on the history and content of the Apostles' Creed (1893).

In his history of the Roman Breviary, Geschichte des Breviers: Versuch einer quellenmässigen Darstellung der Entwicklung des altkirchlichen u. des römischen Officiums bis auf unsere Tage (Freiburg i. Breisgau, Herder: 1895; French tr., R. Biron, Paris: 1905) he condensed the labours of several generations of students of the Breviary and critical results of the modern school of historical liturgists.

He died at Freiburg on 12 August 1894.
