= Bürgel Abbey =

Monastery in Bürgel, Germany

Bürgel Abbey Kloster Bürgel
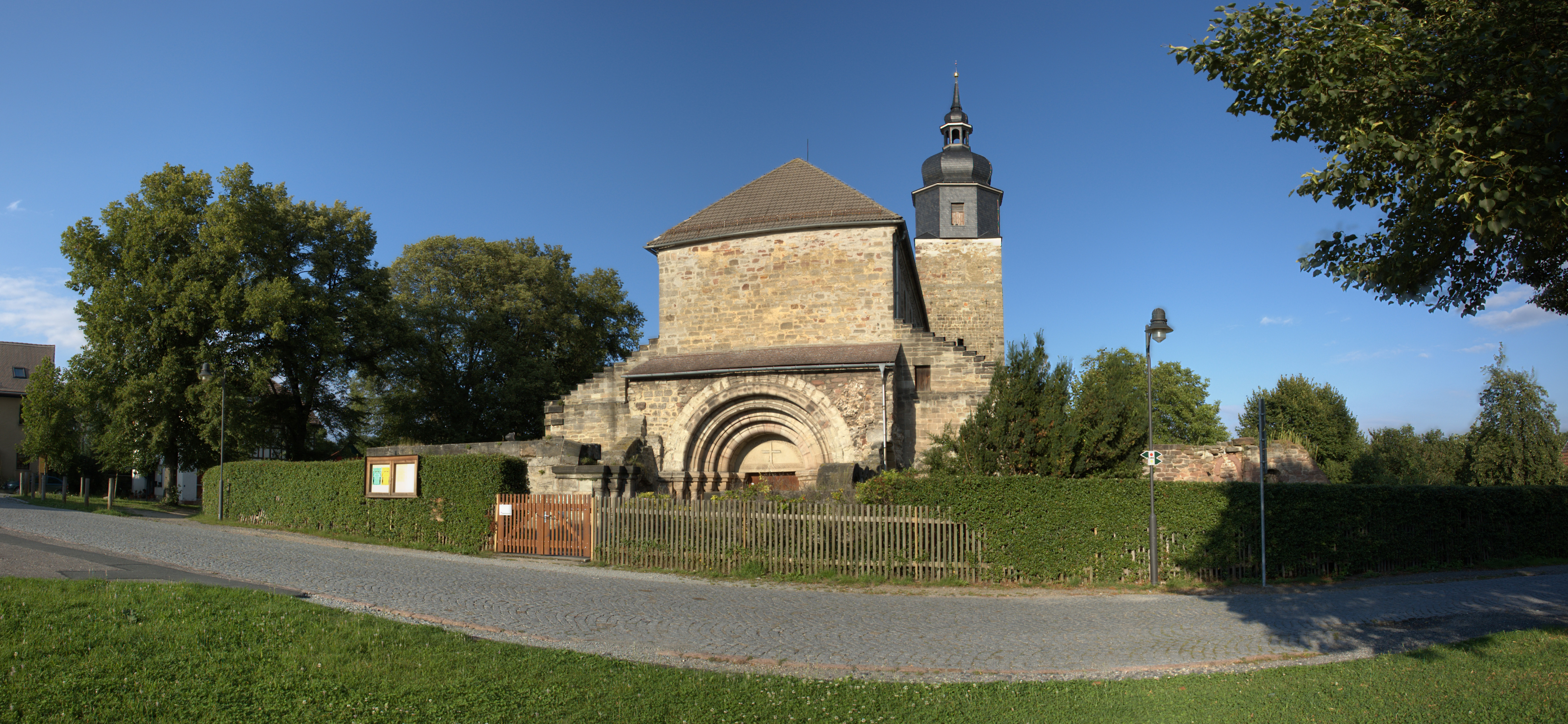
- Façade of the abbey.

Religion
- Affiliation: Roman Catholic
- Diocese: Saale-Holzland-Kreis
- Status: Active

Location
- Location: Thalbürgel, Bürgel, Germany
- Interactive map of Bürgel Abbey; Kloster Bürgel
- Coordinates: 50.935025°N 11.750007°E

Architecture
- Type: Church
- Style: Romanesque

Bürgel Abbey (German: Kloster Bürgel) is a former Benedictine monastery in the village of Thalbürgel of the town of Bürgel in Saale-Holzland-Kreis district in Thuringia, Germany.
