= Dice toll =

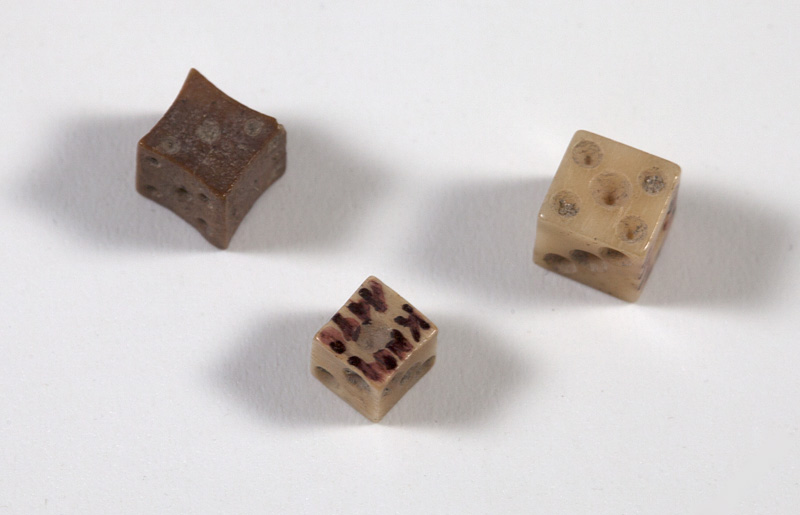
Bone dice originating from Konstanz, dated between 1600 and 1800, in the Jewish Museum of Switzerland’s collection.

The dice toll was a regional supplement to the Leibzoll (German “body tax”) with which Jews had to buy free passage across regional borders. It was widespread in certain regions of Europe from the Middle Ages until the 17th century. While the Leibzoll was a monetary payment, the dice toll was comparatively worthless. The dice payment was often demanded of Jews crossing customs borders, and also played a role outside of the official customs trade as a popular form of anti-Jewish harassment.

== Location and chronology ==
The origins of the dice toll are unknown but it is assumed that it first appeared at the end of the 13th or beginning of the 14th century. The earliest written evidence is contained in documents from 1378, when several feudal lords (Nassau, Trier, Mainz) waived the dice duty for their Jewish subjects. There is evidence of temporary exemptions and purchased privileges in later years, but even though the custom went out of fashion in the 15th century, it remained sporadically in use until the 17th century, sometimes even after the abolition of the actual Leibzoll. Numerous records indicate the persistence of this anti-Jewish custom over the centuries. Regionally, the Würfelzoll can be traced to the archdioceses of Mainz and Trier as well as Hesse, and was particularly prevalent in the Upper Rhine region, Switzerland, Liechtenstein and even as far as Reutte in Tyrol.

== Forms ==
The value of the dice was very low; it was a kind of tip to the customs officials, which was often added to the normal Leibzoll, sometimes even replacing it. Because of its low value, the dice toll was not settled with the customs lord. The original function of an "addition" to the Leibzoll, with which customs officers could shorten their waiting times by playing dice, probably later developed into pure harassment or "punishment", since the dice carried by the Jews in later years were not only worthless, but also made of inferior material, e.g. paper. In a few documented cases, playing cards were demanded instead of dice. The Cologne author Ernst Weyden described the dice duty in 1867 as "one of the many vexatious torments" and "meaningless ridicules" that travelling Jews were subjected to.

The levy often consisted of a so-called “double”; meaning a set of three dice.

In addition to the official dice duty, members of the public, often drunken young men, would harass and threaten Jewish travelers or passers-by, demanding the surrender of their dice. This would sometimes lead to violence. Jews did defend themselves, either physically or legally; there is evidence, for example, of the perpetrators being sentenced to tower fines. These forms of harassment were first documented in the Frankfurt mayor's book of 1473 and in 1714 by Johann Jacob Schudt in his work Jüdische Merckwürdigkeiten.

== Interpretations ==
There are no definitive sources on the origins of the dice toll. The most common interpretation is that the dice toll was an "act of punishment" for Jewish participation in the Passion of Christ story. Various other anti-Jewish measures support this interpretation; Jews were often taxed sums containing the number 30 (the number of silver coins of Judas' wages) and punishments for Jews often involved red-hot nails (pointing to the myths about Jewish participation in forging nails of the cross). The interpretation of the dice toll as punishment for gambling away Christ's garments is in line with this. It arises from a passage in the Gospel of Matthew 27:35: "And they crucified him, and parted his garments, casting lots: that it might be fulfilled which was spoken by the prophet, They parted my garments among them, and upon my vesture did they cast lots." - Contemporary illustrations often depicted this scene with figures throwing dice at the foot of the cross.

Alternatively, the dice toll could be interpreted as a mockery of Jewish customs, such as those from the festival of Purim. According to Gerd Mentgen, a similar connection could be made to the cube-like Jewish Hanukkah dreidels, to which outsiders may have attributed special powers. Among other arguments, the historian substantiates this approach with sources indicating that dice with red lettering in particular were frequently extorted from Jews.

Finally, it cannot be ruled out that the game of dice, which was also widespread among Jews and "the devil's work" from the church's point of view, might have contributed to the origins of the dice toll. Dice-making as a craft is documented among Jews and in Jewish quarters – and the surname Würfel (German for dice), Wörpel or Werfel occurs among both Jews and Christians.
