= Mariano Armellino =

Italian Benedictine abbot and historian

Mariano Armellino (1657–1737) was a Benedictine abbot and historian.

== Life ==
He was born in Rome or Ancona. At the age of twenty he entered the monastery of St. Paul in Rome, whence he was sent to Monte Cassino to complete his studies. From 1687 to 1695 he taught philosophy at various monasteries of the Cassinese Congregation. From 1697 to 1722 he devoted himself to preaching and became famous throughout Italy for his Lenten sermons. In 1722 Pope Innocent XIII appointed him abbot of the monastery at Siena; in 1729 he was transferred as abbot to the Monastery of St. Peter at Assisi, and in 1734, to the Monastery at St. Felician, near Foligno.

He died at Foligno.

== Works ==
He wrote the Bibliotheca Benedictino-Casinensis, a list and sketch of the authors of the Cassinese Congregation, and a few other historical and hagiographical works concerning the Cassinese Congregation of Benedictines.
