= John Roberts (martyr) =

Welsh saint

Saint John Roberts O.S.B
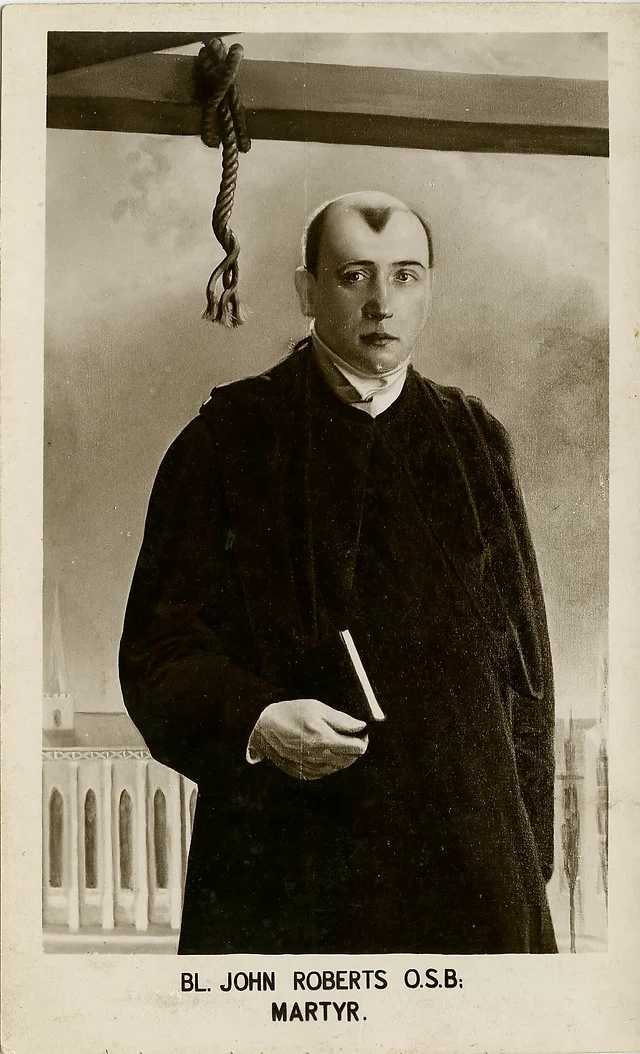
- Roberts depicted by an unknown 20th-century artist

Martyr
- Born: c. 1577; Trawsfynydd, Wales
- Died: 10 December 1610 (aged 32–33); Tyburn, London, England
- Venerated in: Catholic Church
- Beatified: 4 December 1886 by Leo XIII
- Canonized: 25 October 1970, St Peter's Basilica, Vatican City by Paul VI
- Major shrine: Downside and Erdington Abbeys
- Feast: 10 December (individual), 25 October (collectively with Forty Martyrs of England and Wales)

John Roberts, OSB (1577 – 10 December 1610) was a Welsh Benedictine monk and priest, and was the first prior of St. Gregory's, Douai, France (now Downside Abbey). Returning to Britain as a missionary priest during the period of recusancy, he was martyred at Tyburn. He is venerated as a saint by the Catholic church.

== Early life and conversion to Catholicism ==
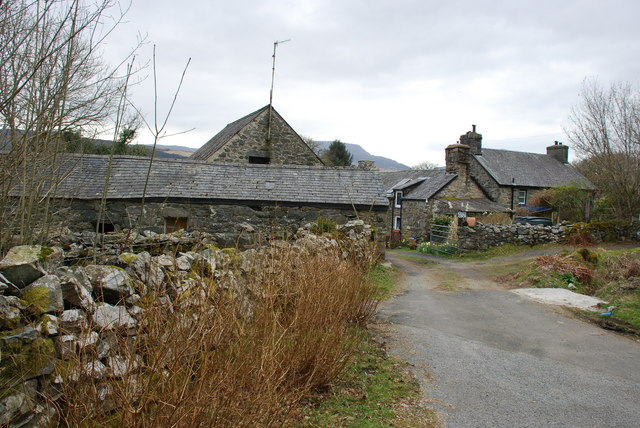
Gelli Goch, home of John Roberts

Roberts was born in 1577 in Trawsfynydd, a small village in Snowdonia, north Wales, the son of John and Anna Roberts of Rhiw Goch Farm. His father, a farmer, was a member of the Welsh nobility and was descended from the Welsh Princes. Roberts was baptised into the Anglican faith inside the local parish church of St Madryn but is said to have received his early education from an elderly man who had been a Cistercian monk at Cymer Abbey just outside Dolgellau until its dissolution by Henry VIII in 1537. He attended St. John's College, Oxford in February, 1595 before leaving after two years to study law at Furnival's Inn, London.

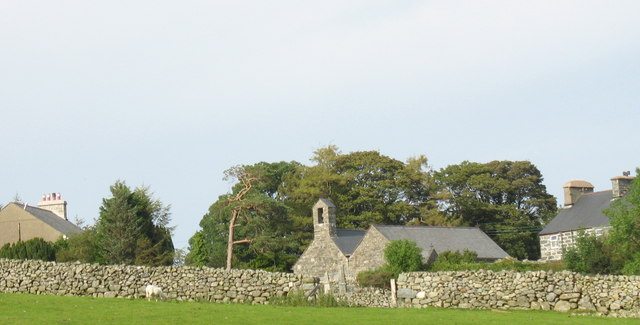
St Madryn's Church, Trawsfynydd, where Roberts was baptised

During his travels in Europe, he left both the law and his former faith behind, converting to Catholicism on a visit to Notre Dame Cathedral in Paris. He moved on to Spain and joined St Benedict's Monastery, Valladolid, and became a member of this community in 1598, where he was known as Brother John of Merioneth in reference to his birthplace.

== Benedictine missionary ==
From Valladolid, he was sent to make his novitiate at San Martín Pinario, Santiago de Compostela, where he made his profession towards the end of 1600. Having completed his studies, he was ordained and set out for Britain on 26 December 1602. Although observed by a Government spy, Roberts and his companions succeeded in entering the country in April 1603, where he was appointed vicar of the English monks of the Spanish Congregation on the Mission. He was arrested and banished on 13 May.

He reached Douai, in northern France, on 24 May. Soon, he returned to Britain and worked among the plague victims in London. In 1604, while embarking for Spain with four postulants, including William Scott (later known as Maurus Scott), he was again arrested. Not recognized as a priest, he was released and then banished again, but he returned to Britain at once.

On 5 November 1605, while Justice Grange was searching the house of Mrs. Percy, the first wife of Thomas Percy, who was involved in the Gunpowder Plot, he found Roberts there and arrested him. Though acquitted of any complicity in the plot itself, Roberts was imprisoned in the Gatehouse Prison at Westminster for seven months and then exiled again in July 1606.

== Foundation of St. Gregory's monastery, Douai ==
This time, he was absent for some fourteen months, nearly all of which he spent at Douai (now in northern France), where he founded and became the first prior of a house for the English Benedictine monks who had entered various Spanish monasteries. This was the beginning of the monastery of St. Gregory's at Douai. This community of monks was banished from France during the French Revolution in 1795 and travelled to England, where they settled at Downside Abbey, Somerset, in 1814.

== Return to Britain and martyrdom ==
Roberts returned to Britain in October 1607, and in December, he was arrested again and placed in the Gatehouse at Westminster, from which he escaped after some months. After his escape, he lived in London for about a year, but in May 1609 was taken to Newgate Prison. He might have been executed, but Antonie de la Broderie, the French ambassador, interceded on his behalf, and his sentence was reduced to banishment.

Roberts again visited Spain and Douai but returned to Britain for a fifth time within a year. He was captured again on 2 December 1610; the arresting men arrived just as he was finishing saying Mass in a house, having been followed by former priest turned spy John Cecil, who had compiled a dossier on Roberts for James I. He was taken to Newgate in his vestments. On 5 December he was tried and found guilty under the Act forbidding priests to minister, and on 10 December was hanged, drawn, and quartered, at the age of thirty-three, along with Thomas Somers, at Tyburn, London.

It was usual for the prisoner to be disembowelled while still alive, but he was very popular among the poor of London because of the kindness he had shown them during the plague, and the large crowd which gathered at his execution would not allow this. They insisted he be hanged to the death so as not to feel the pain. His heart was then held aloft by the executioner, who proclaimed: "Behold the heart of the traitor!" But the angry crowd did not provide the standard response of "Long live the King!"; there was deathly silence.

== Veneration ==
The introduction of the cause of beatification was approved by Pope Leo XIII in his Decree of 4 December 1886. On 25 October 1970, Roberts was canonised by Pope Paul VI as one of the representative Forty Martyrs of England and Wales.

Roman Catholic Bishop Edwin Regan said: "Although the name St John Roberts isn't as well known today, he is a major figure in our religious history." He was the first monk to return to Britain following the Protestant Reformation; the hostility between the Catholics and Protestants was at its height at this stage, when a Catholic priest could only expect to live for approximately two years in Britain during that period.

On 17 July 2010, Metropolitan Seraphim of Glastonbury of the British Orthodox Church, accompanied by Deacon Theodore de Quincey, attended an Ecumenical Service at Westminster Cathedral in celebration of the 400th anniversary of the Martyrdom of John Roberts. Abba Seraphim noted that as a Londoner, he wanted to honour the humanitarian and pastoral ministry of Roberts to Londoners; and that all those who are conscious of the problems of exercising Christian ministry in times of persecution would immediately value Roberts's determination, as well as realise the extraordinary sacrifice he made to fulfil his priestly vocation. Large contingents from Wales were in attendance, and the service was bilingual. Archbishop of Canterbury Rowan Williams addressed the congregation in both English and Welsh. It was the first time Welsh had been spoken in a ceremony at Westminster Cathedral.

The choral piece, "Beatus Juan de Mervinia" in both Latin and Welsh, was specially commissioned for the service from the Welsh composer Brian Hughes.

Roberts is commemorated by a tourist trail from St Madryn's church Trawsfynydd to Cymer Abbey near Dolgellau, and by an exhibition in the Llys Ednowain Heritage Centre in Trawsfynydd.

=== Relics ===
The body of Roberts was recovered by a group that included Maurus Scott and taken to St. Gregory's, Douai, but disappeared during the French Revolution. An arm was found in the possession of the Spanish royal family before being returned to the Cathedral of Santiago de Compostela, where he had served as a novice. Fingers preserved as relics went to Downside Abbey, to Erdington Abbey, to the Sacred Cross Church in Gellilydan near Robert's birthplace, to Tyburn convent and to St Joseph's Convent, Taunton.
