= Maurus Scott =

English lawyer, Benedictine monk, priest, missionary and Catholic martyr

Blessed Maurus Scott O.S.B

Martyr
- Born: c. 1579; Chigwell, Essex, England
- Died: 30 May 1612 (aged 32-34); Tyburn, London, England
- Beatified: 15 December 1929 by Pope Pius XI
- Feast: 30 May

Maurus Scott (c. 1579 – 30 May 1612), born William Scott, was an English lawyer who became a Benedictine monk and priest, serving as a missionary in England during the period of recusancy. He was executed at Tyburn, and is a Catholic martyr.

== Early life and conversion ==
Scott was born in Chigwell, Essex around 1579, and was baptized in the Church of England. He was sent to school in London, and entered the University of Cambridge during Lent term 1593-94. At first he joined Trinity College, however, after a year he decided to migrate to Trinity Hall, which at the time was particularly noted for its excellence in the field of civil law, which Scott described as "a branch of study which was more comformable with my disposition and interested me more". He received the degree of LL.B. in 1600, and proceeded to London and the Inner Temple to train as a barrister.

It was at this time that he began to seriously consider his religious faith. He had been firmly of the position that Catholicism and its claims were both false and treasonable, however, while visiting a Catholic friend, he began casually flicking through a book of theology and was struck by the force of an argument he read there. This caused him to enter into a period of intensive study and prayer, and it was only after two years of intellectual and spiritual struggle that he finally decided to be received into the Catholic Church.

== Entry into Benedictine life ==
A notable catalyst in the process of Scott's conversion was the Benedictine prior John Roberts, who had come to London as a missionary. It was Roberts who received Scott into the Catholic Church, and also Roberts who accepted him as a Benedictine postulant. Scott was to be taken to Valladolid, Spain for his monastic formation in the Lent of 1604, but on attempting to leave England, he was arrested along with Roberts and a group of other postulants on suspicion of being Catholic. However, this arrest proved only a temporary delay, as immediately after his release he was taken to Valladolid by Augustine Bradshaw, where it was agreed that he should serve his novitiate at the Abbey of San Facundo, Sahagún.

As a Benedictine monk he took the name Maurus, and, in 1610, was ordained priest. He begged to be sent on the mission to England, and his request was granted. He was sent to St Gregory's monastery, Douai (which still survives as Downside Abbey, having moved to England in the 19th century), where he was to make his preparations, and arrived in England in December 1610.

== Witness to the martyrdom of John Roberts ==
Immediately after arriving in England, he was to discover that John Roberts, who had had such a profound influence upon him, had been arrested for serving as a priest. He was able to join Roberts for his last meal the night before he was put to death. The next day Scott watched as John Roberts was hanged, drawn, and quartered.

After the execution, wishing to preserve Roberts' body as a relic, Scott watched to see where it was thrown. The limbs had been thrown into a large trench, and upon them were heaped the bodies of 16 criminals executed at the same time. Nonetheless, two days later Scott was part of a group which successfully recovered the body parts from the trench, although one quarter was lost when the party was disturbed by watchmen, and Scott was subsequently arrested. Following this, he was imprisoned for a year, until in December 1611 the ambassador for Savoy negotiated the release of imprisoned Catholic priests. Scott was banished from the country and went back to Douai. Nonetheless, he was extremely keen to return to England. Around the Easter week of 1612 he was arrested on a boat on the River Thames before he was even able to set foot in London.

== Arrest, trial and martyrdom ==
After his arrest, he was examined by George Abbot, who had been Bishop of London at the time of the execution of John Roberts and Scott's arrest in 1610, and was now Archbishop of Canterbury. Abbot offered Scott an oath of loyalty to King James I. However, seeing that the oath was constructed in such a way that it implied disloyalty to the Pope and the Catholic Church, Scott instead suggested his own formula, declaring "that I am a loyal servant to His Majesty... also for the past and for the future, that I have been and to the last moment of my life will ever be loyal to my King; which is more than you exact by your statute". However, this was not accepted and Scott was placed in close confinement (although not before drawing on his legal expertise to insist that Abbot did not have jurisdiction to hand down such a punishment).

Scott was tried on the 28 May 1612 at the Old Bailey. Again, his legal training was in evidence, as he skillfully avoided the questioning of those accusing him of being a priest, and insisted that it was the business of the prosecutor to bring evidence against him, not for him to convict himself. He entered a plea of not guilty. Only after the jury had found him guilty did he fall to his knees, crying out Deo Gratias, and admitted to his being a priest. He then addressed the people in the court, explaining that the only reason that he had not yet confessed himself as a priest was to see if the law would take its course, or whether he would be condemned on presumption of guilt without any proof.

On the morning of May 30 he was to be executed with Richard Newport, another Catholic priest. He appeared wearing his Benedictine habit and declared himself once again a loyal subject of the King, before being tied to a horse and dragged through the streets to the gallows at Tyburn. Before being executed, he made a declaration of his life, his faith and his conversion to the Catholic Church, and gave the small number of gold coins he had in his purse to the executioner, saying, "Take these, friend, for love of me. I give them to you with good will and gladly do I forgive you my death". He was then hanged, drawn and quartered.

== Beatification ==
Scott was one of a number of English martyrs beatified by Pope Pius XI in 1929. The reliquary of Blessed Maurus Scott is venerated at the minor basilica of St Gregory the Great at Downside Abbey.

== Sources ==
- Camm, Bede (1931) Nine Martyr Monks, pp. 180–237.
