= Christopher Butler (bishop) =

Benedictine monk, bishop and biblical scholar (1902–1986)

The Right Reverend Christopher Butler OSB
- Auxiliary Bishop of Westminster
- Church: Roman Catholic
- Archdiocese: Westminster
- In office: 1966–1986
- Other post: Titular Bishop of Nova Barbara
- Previous posts: Abbot of Downside; 1946–1966

Orders
- Ordination: 10 June 1933
- Consecration: 21 December 1966 by Cardinal John Heenan

Personal details
- Born: Basil Edward Butler; 7 May 1902 Reading, Berkshire, England
- Died: 20 September 1986 (aged 84) St John's Wood, London
- Buried: Downside, Somerset
- Denomination: Roman Catholic
- Residence: Downside Abbey
- Parents: William Edward Butler; Bertha Alice née Bowman
- Occupation: Monastic bishop
- Profession: Biblical scholar
- Education: Reading School; St John's College, Oxford

Christopher Butler OSB (born Basil Edward Butler; 7 May 1902 – 20 September 1986), was an English Catholic prelate who served as an auxiliary bishop for the Archdiocese of Westminster from 1966 to 1986. He was a convert from the Church of England, a Benedictine monk, and a biblical scholar.

After his Profession as a monk and his Ordination as a Roman Catholic priest, he became the 7th Abbot of Downside, the Abbot President of the English Benedictine Congregation, an Auxiliary Bishop of Westminster, a scripture scholar, a defender of the priority of the Gospel according to Matthew, and the pre-eminent English-speaking Council Father at the Second Vatican Council (1962–65).

== Religious life ==
Born in 1902 to a family of wine merchants, Butler attended Reading School before going up to St John's College, Oxford. He then taught for a year at Brighton College.

In 1928 Butler, having previously been baptized in the Church of England, was received into full communion with the Roman Catholic Church. The next year, he became a monk of the Benedictine community of Downside Abbey, a House of the English Benedictine Congregation, and was ordained priest there in 1933. In 1946 the community elected him as Abbot, which he remained for twenty years until his consecration in 1966 as Titular Bishop of Nova Barbara and Auxiliary Bishop to Cardinal John Carmel Heenan in the Archdiocese of Westminster.

== Scholarly career ==
Butler's wide-reaching interests and competence included theology, spirituality, contemplative prayer, ecumenism, the Church Fathers and the dialogue with contemporaries such as the Revd Dr Bernard Lonergan. He wrote The Church and Infallibility: A Reply to the Abridged 'Salmon', in response to George Salmon's criticism of papal infallibility and the infallibility of the Church.

Defending, like his predecessor Abbot John Chapman and his fellow monks, Dom Bernard Orchard and Dom Gregory Murray, the traditionally-maintained priority of the Gospel according to Matthew, Butler published a critique of the two-document hypothesis and a study of the indebtedness of the Gospel according to Luke to the Gospel according to Matthew (cf. Synoptic Problem).

== Role at Vatican II ==
It was in his capacity as Abbot President (1961–66) of the English Benedictine Congregation and as an outstanding scripture scholar, that Butler was called to Rome to participate in the Second Vatican Council (1962–65). He was one of maybe two dozen "men who made the Council", contributing, often in fluent Latin, to many of the Council's documents, e.g. The Dogmatic Constitution on Divine Revelation (Dei verbum) which he regarded as their very underpinning, and subsequently was a strong proponent of the teachings of Vatican II.

== Publications ==
Bishop Butler was a prolific writer, a bibliography of his books, articles and reviews running to some 337 titles. He was a popular guest on BBC Radio.

== Works ==
- The Theology of Vatican II (1967)
- Searchings: Essays and Studies (1975)

== See also ==
- Abbots of Downside
