= Upside =

Upside can refer to:

- The Upside, a 2017 American film directed by Neil Burger
- Upside (film), a 2010 American film directed by Ken Horstmann
- Upside (magazine), a defunct San Francisco-based business and technology magazine
- "Upside", a 2008 song by James from the album Hey Ma
- Upside Foods, an American food technology company headquartered in Berkeley, California
- Upside Records, an English record label

== See also ==
- Downside (disambiguation)
- Upside Down (disambiguation)
