= Upside Down =

Upside Down or Upsidedown may refer to:

== Arts, entertainment, and media ==
=== Films ===
- Upside Down (1919 film), a 1919 American silent film
- Upside Down (2012 film), a 2012 Canadian-French film starring Jim Sturgess and Kirsten Dunst
- Upside Down (2015 film), a 2015 South Korean film
- Upside Down: The Creation Records Story, a 2010 film by Danny O'Connor

=== Music ===
==== Groups ====
- Upside Down (group), a British boyband later reformed as Orange Orange
- The Upsidedown, an American alt-rock band
- UpsideDown (DJ), Canadian producer and DJ

==== Albums ====
- Upside Down (Thomas Leeb album), 2006
- Upside Down (Set It Off album), 2016
- Up Side Down, a 1996 album by Shoko Inoue

==== Songs ====
- "Upside Down" (Diana Ross song), 1980
- "Upside Down" (The Jesus and Mary Chain song), 1984
- "Upside Down" (A-Teens song), 2000
- "Upside Down" (Paloma Faith song), 2009
- "Upside Down" (Jack Johnson song), 2006
- "Upside Down", a 1973 song by Hawkwind from Space Ritual
- "Upside Down", a 1986 song by Two Minds Crack from The Victory Parade; covered by 6cyclemind in 2007 for their album Home
- "Upside Down", a 1991 song by Tori Amos from Silent All These Years
- "Upside-Down", a 1992 song by Yo La Tengo from May I Sing with Me
- "Upside Down", a 1999 song by Elf Power from Come On
- "Upside Down", a 2000 song by ZOEgirl from ZOEgirl
- "Upside Down", a 2003 song by Alphaville from CrazyShow
- "Upside Down", a 2003 song by Barenaked Ladies from Everything to Everyone
- "Upside Down", a 2006 song by Jakalope from Born 4
- "Upside Down", a 2009 song by Snoop Dogg from Malice n Wonderland
- "Upsidedown", a 2012 song by Lacuna Coil from Dark Adrenaline
- "Upside Down", a 2013 song by Ross Lynch from Austin & Ally: Turn It Up
- "Upside Down", a 2015 song by Dean Brody from Gypsy Road
- "Upside Down", a 2018 song by The Story So Far from Proper Dose
- "Upside Down", a 2020 song by Royce da 5'9" from The Allegory
- "Upside Down", a 2025 song by Ho99o9 from Tomorrow We Escape
- "Upside Down", a 2026 song by BoyNextDoor from Home
- "Upside Down", a 2026 song by Natalie Imbruglia from Algorithm

=== Television ===
- "Chapter Eight: The Upside Down", the season 1 finale episode of Stranger Things
- The Upside Down Show, an Australian children's TV show
- "Upside Down", an episode of the TV series Pocoyo

=== Other uses in arts, entertainment, and media ===
- Upside Down (book), a 1998 book by Eduardo Galeano
- Upside Down, also known as the Chinese Water Torture Cell, an escape routine by Harry Houdini
- Upside Down (Stranger Things), an alternate reality that is a key plot element of the television show Stranger Things

== Other uses ==
- Upside-down (loan) or negative equity or being under water, owing more on a loan than the value of the asset that the loan was used to purchase

== See also ==
- Downside Up, a box set by Siouxsie and the Banshees
- Inverted question and exclamation marks
- Point reflection
- Southern Hemisphere
- The Upside of Down (disambiguation)
- Transformation of text
- Upside-down cake
