= John Chapman (priest) =

Roman Catholic Abbot of Downside Abbey (1865–1933)

The Right Reverend Dom John Chapman OSB
- Abbot of Downside
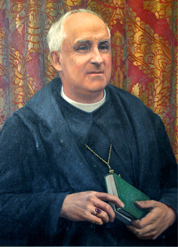
- Church: Catholic Church
- Installed: 1929
- Term ended: 1933
- Predecessor: Leander Ramsay
- Successor: Bruno Hicks

Personal details
- Born: Henry Chapman; 25 April 1865 Suffolk, United Kingdom
- Died: 7 November 1933 (aged 68) Downside Abbey, Stratton-on-the-Fosse, Somerset, United Kingdom
- Buried: Downside Abbey
- Denomination: Roman Catholic
- Education: Christ Church, Oxford

John Chapman OSB (born Henry Palmer Chapman; 25 April 1865 – 7 November 1933) was an English Roman Catholic abbot of Downside Abbey of the English Benedictine Congregation from 1929 until his death, and a New Testament and patristics scholar.

He is best known for having founded Worth, in West Sussex, a private school in Britain.

== Anglican background ==
Henry Palmer Chapman was born in Ashfield, Suffolk, the son of an Anglican canon of Ely Cathedral. Because of delicate health, Henry was, at first, educated privately at home, and then later at Christ Church, Oxford (1883–1886), where he received a first-class degree in Classical Greats. He stayed for a subsequent year at Oxford studying theology, in which he took a third (cf. the "gentleman's C" in the U.S.). It was an important year for him, however, because in this time he decided to be ordained in the Church of England.

Having trained at Cuddesdon near Oxford, Chapman was ordained as a deacon in the Church of England in 1889 and began a curacy in the parish of St Pancras, London. He found himself increasingly troubled during this time about the position of the Church of England and left the parish soon after Trinity Sunday.

== Conversion to Catholicism ==
In December 1890, Chapman was conditionally baptized in the Catholic Church at Brompton Oratory. In April 1891 he entered the Jesuit novitiate at Manresa House, Roehampton (now Parkstead House), but decided to leave after eight months.

He subsequently entered the Benedictine Maredsous Abbey in Belgium, where he had been preceded by a friend from Cuddesdon, Bede Camm. Chapman was given the religious name of "John", and professed simple vows on 25 March 1893. He made his solemn vows on Whitsuntide 1895. After his priestly ordination in 1895, he went to Erdington Abbey, near Birmingham, where he stayed until 1912, serving the community as novice master and later as prior.

Having spent nine months at Maredsous, in February 1913 Chapman was made temporary superior of the Caldey island community (now based at Prinknash Abbey), when it was received into the Roman Catholic Church in 1913–14.

At the outbreak of World War I, Chapman became a Professor of Theology at Downside Abbey, joining the many monks who had fled Maredsous to England. In early 1915, when these monks moved to Ireland, he became army chaplain to the British forces. After initial training, his brigade arrived in France in July 1915. He lived in the trenches in the autumn of 1915, until a persistent knee injury led to his hospitalization in November 1915. He was later stationed at Boyton Camp, Wiltshire, for several months, and then returned to France. At the end of 1917, he was transferred to Switzerland, where multilingual chaplains were needed for the POW camps. He remained there until the armistice.

=== 4th Abbot of Downside ===
In 1919 Chapman transferred his monastic stability to Downside Abbey. He spent most of 1919 to 1922 in Rome, though, working on a commission on the revision of the Vulgate translation of the Bible. He returned to Downside in 1922, where in 1929 the community elected him as abbot.

As the fourth abbot of Downside, during his short term of four years, he helped transform Downside into a modern abbey in the mainstream of the Benedictine tradition and in 1933 became the founder of Worth Priory (which became independent of Downside in 1957 and Worth Abbey in 1965).

=== New Testament and patristics scholar ===
John Chapman not only read both Greek and Latin with facility, but also read and wrote French, Italian, and German. Many of his contributions to biblical scholarship and patristics have proved of lasting value, especially his work on Cyprian, John the Presbyter, and on the priority of the Gospel according to Matthew that, so Chapman argued in support of the early Church tradition, was the first Gospel account to have been written (see also Synoptic Problem).

Among the novices that Chapman clothed in the monastic habit was in 1932 John Bernard Orchard, who soon felt drawn to follow his Abbot into researching the priority of the Gospel according to Matthew in the light of the patristic evidence, and eventually, after also constructing a synopsis of the four Gospel accounts in Greek and English for the easier study of the compositional sequence Matthew-Luke-Mark-John that is supported by certain early Christian writers, produced what by hindsight may be considered a synthesis of his and his mentor's insights.

=== Spiritual director ===
In his day Chapman was a much sought-after spiritual director. He published a collection of letters under the title Spiritual Letters.

== Works ==
Chapman made a number of contributions to the Catholic Encyclopedia on the Early Church Fathers and Councils.

- St Irenaeus and the Dates of the Gospels, JTS 6 (1904-5): 563–9.
- Bishop Gore and the Catholic Claims, (London, 1905).
- The Condemnation of Pope Honorius (London, Catholic Truth Society, 1907).
- Notes on the Early History of the Vulgate Gospels, (Oxford, 1908).
- John the Presbyter, (Oxford, 1911).
- St Paul and the Revelation to St Peter, Rev. Ben. 29 (1912): 133–47.
- Studies on the Early Papacy, (London, 1928; repr. 1971).
- Saint Benedict and the Sixth Century, (London, 1929).
- Spiritual Letters, posthumously, (London, 1935).
- Matthew, Mark, and Luke, posthumously (ed. J. M. T. Barton), (London, 1937).
