= Downside =

Downside may refer to:

- Downside, North Somerset, a sub-district of Backwell, Somerset, England
- Downside, Somerset, a hamlet near Chilcompton in England
  - Downside Abbey, a monastery in Somerset, England
  - Downside School, a public school in Somerset, England
- Downside, Surrey, a small village in Surrey, England
- Downside, New South Wales, Australia

== See also ==
- Upside (disambiguation)
- Doonside (disambiguation)
- Douneside, Aberdeenshire, Scotland
