= Hubert van Zeller =

Benedictine writer, sculptor, and cartoonist

- Born: 1905; Egypt
- Died: 11 May 1984 (aged 78–79)
- Occupations: Writer, sculptor, cartoonist
- Writing career
- Pen name: Brother Choleric
- Subjects: Catholicism; the human condition; monasticism

Hubert van Zeller (1905 – 11 May 1984) was a Benedictine writer, sculptor, and theologian, noted for writing about human suffering from a Catholic perspective. Under the pseudonym Brother Choleric, he was also active as a cartoonist, making satirical drawings and comics about life in monasteries.

== Biography ==
Born in Egypt in 1905, van Zeller entered the Benedictine novitiate at the age of nineteen. At one point, he left the Benedictines to join a Carthusian monastery, hoping to experience a deeper and more intense understanding of his faith. He later returned to the Benedictines. He resided at Downside Abbey during his monastic life. Dom Hubert lived at St. Walburga's in Colorado, USA and then the Little Sisters of the Poor house in Denver, Colorado in the 1970s-1983.

A skilled writer and sculptor, van Zeller's artwork can be seen in churches throughout Britain and the United States. Many of his written works focused on responses to suffering, including Suffering: The Catholic Answer and The Mystery of Suffering; afflicted with illness for much of his life, he maintained an optimistic worldview. His 1966 autobiography, entitled One Foot in the Cradle, discusses his experiences serving in the monastery as well as his close friendship with Monsignor Ronald Knox, who would later dedicate one of his books to van Zeller. A deeply devout man, his sole possessions during his monastic life were a toothbrush and a typewriter. Under the name Brother Choleric, he created a series of cartoon books about the cloistered life of nuns and monks, beginning with Cracks in the Cloister (1954, Sheed & Ward, New York).

== Quotes ==
"Now, hope starts off by knowing that life is going to be difficult. It admits that, without grace, perfection is miles out of reach. It faces the idea of failure. It sees how there are bound to be disappointments and temptations all along the line. But it just goes right on trusting. A person who is strong in this kind of hope looks upon everything that comes along—even mistakes and serious failures—as being a chance not to be missed."

From The Mystery of Suffering: "The Christian ideal is shown to us in the garden of Gethsemane: our Lord asking that the suffering might pass from him, while at the same time being ready to bear it if this is the Father's will."

From The Mystery of Suffering: "The saints flinch as instinctively as others when the cross comes along, but they do not allow their flinching to upset their perspectives."

"All I can say is that had I been healthy all my life I would not have prayed [so well] or put myself in God's hands; and had I been better looking I would not have escaped situations which the more handsome of my friends got themselves involved in."

When discussing people's fear of death with Ronald Knox: "One clings, and I can't think why. You would have thought anyone would prefer heaven to fruit juice."

== Republications of van Zeller's Books ==
Several publishers have brought out new editions of van Zeller's writing since his death. Sophia Institute Press has republished Approach to Suffering under the title Suffering with a Purpose and Praying While You Work under the title Holiness for Housewives. Canadian based publisher Arouca Press released a new edition of Our Lady, A Presentation for Beginners in 2019. In 2022, Benedictine publishing house The Cenacle Press at Silverstream Priory began republishing a number of van Zeller's books in entirely re-formatted and fresh editions. Available world-wide, these were published with permission from Downside Abbey. The republications of van Zeller's books were hailed by media outlets such as Catholic Exchange, Catholic World Report, and Salvo magazine as sources of wisdom and helpful spiritual advice. The titles republished by The Cenacle Press are:

- Approach to Prayer
- Approach to Christian Sculpture (illustrated, with a new foreword by Julian Kwasniewski)
- Approach to Spirituality
- We Live with Our Eyes Open
- Approach to Penance
- Approach to Monasticism
- Sanctity In Other Words
- We Die Standing Up
- Letters to a Soul
- We Work While the Light Lasts
