= Aidan Bellenger =

English historian (born 1950)

Dominic Terence Joseph Bellenger, FSA, FRHistS (born 21 July 1950), also known by his monastic name of Dom Aidan Bellenger, is an English historian and former Benedictine monk and schoolmaster. He was headmaster of Downside School from 1991 to 1995 and later Abbot of Downside Abbey from 2006 to 2014.

== Early life and education ==
Bellenger was born on 21 July 1950 to Gerald Bellenger and his wife, Kathleen Patricia O'Donnell. He was educated at Finchley Catholic Grammar School and Jesus College, Cambridge, where he graduated BA in 1972, promoted to MA in 1975. His first degree was in History. He later studied theology at the Pontifical University of Saint Thomas Aquinas in Rome.

In 1975, Bellenger took up an appointment as an assistant schoolmaster at St Mary's School, Cambridge, a high school for girls, where he taught until 1978. In that year he was the University Lightfoot Scholar and graduated Ph.D. from Cambridge with a dissertation on refugees in the French Revolution.

== Career ==
Bellenger taught history at Downside School as a lay master between 1978 and 1982, and made solemn vows in 1986. He was ordained in 1988, and in 1991 the Abbot appointed him as headmaster of the school, to succeed Dom Philip Jebb. He continued in that post until 1995, when he became parish priest of Little Malvern, Worcestershire. In 1999, he was appointed as parish priest of Stratton-on-the-Fosse (where Downside is) and also joined the board of governors of the school. From 2001 to 2006 he served as prior to Abbot Richard Yeo, then was himself Abbot from 2006 to 2014, while also continuing as parish priest of Stratton-on-the-Fosse until 2014.

In 2010, as Abbot of Downside, Bellenger said of the abbey:

The main ways in which the monks of the Downside community work to spread the Gospel are through the witness of our life and our prayer, through education, especially in the school which we run, and through serving in the parishes which have been entrusted to our care... We monks are trying to listen to what God is saying to us. We have found that our monastery is a place where many people come to pray, and where they also try to listen to God's voice and get to know and love him better.

Bellenger was monastic editor of The Downside Review for the year 2017–2018, and in 2018 The Tablet published an article by him on Buckfast Abbey.

A Senior Research Associate of St Edmund's College, Cambridge, Bellenger is a member of the Faculty of History, a Fellow of the Royal Society of Arts, the Society of Antiquaries, the Royal Historical Society, and the Higher Education Academy.

== Selected publications ==
- 'The English Catholics and the French Exiled Clergy', Recusant History, 15 (6) (1981), pp. 433–51
- English and Welsh Priests, 1558–1800 (Bath, 1984)
- 'The French Priests at the King's House, Winchester, 1792–1796', in Proceedings of the Hampshire Field Club and Archaeological Society XL (1984), pp. 99–105
- The French Exiled Clergy in the British Isles After 1789 (Bath: Downside Abbey Books, 1986)
- 'Two Antiquarian Monks: the Papers of Dom Bede Camm and Dom Ethelbert Horn at Downside', Catholic Archives 6 (1986)
- 'Dom Bede Camm (1864–1942), Monastic Martyrologist', in Diana Wood (ed.), Martyrs and martyrologies: papers read at the 1992 Summer Meeting and the 1993 Winter Meeting of the Ecclesiastical History Society (1993)
- 'The Brussels Nuns at Winchester, 1794–1857 ' English Benedictine Congregation History Commission Symposium (1999), 1–9
- 'Religious Life for Men' in V. A. McClelland (ed.), From without the Flamian Gate: 150 Years of Catholicism in England and Wales, 1850–2000 (London: Darton, Longman and Todd, 1999 ISBN 978-0-232-52177-1), 142–166
- Princes of the Church: A History of the English Cardinals, with Stella Fletcher (Sutton Publishing Ltd, 2001, ISBN 978-0-7509-2630-0)
- William Bernard Ullathorne (2001)
- Medieval Worlds: A Sourcebook, ed. Roberta Anderson and Dominic Aidan Bellenger (London : Routledge, 2003)
- 'Butler, Basil Edward [Christopher Butler] (1902–1986)', in Oxford Dictionary of National Biography (Oxford University Press, 2004)
- Medieval Religion: A Sourcebook, ed. Roberta Anderson and Dominic Aidan Bellenger (Taylor & Francis, 2006 ISBN 9780415370288)
- 'Gasquet, Francis Neil (1846–1929)' in Oxford Dictionary of National Biography (Oxford University Press, 2007)
- 'Seeking God as a Benedictine Monk' in Edward Leigh, Alex Haydon, The Nation that Forgot God (Social Affairs Unit, 2009, ISBN 978-1-904863-41-0)
- Downside Abbey: An Architectural History (Merrell, 2011, ISBN 978-1-85894-542-2)
- 'Religion on the Edge: Dissenting Congregations on the Somerset and Dorset Borders in the 17th and 18th Centuries', Somerset & Dorset Notes & Queries, 37, September 2012, 170–172
- O.S.B. Monks with a Mission: English Benedictine History (Bath: Downside Abbey Press, 2014 ISBN 978-1-898663-50-8)
- Monastic Identities: Essays in the History of St Gregory’s, Downside (Bath: Downside Abbey Press, 2014 ISBN 978-1-898663-49-2)
- 200 Downside Monks (Bath: Downside Abbey Press, 2015 ISBN 9781898663454)
