= Bede Camm =

English Benedictine monk and scholar (1864–1942)

Dom Bede Camm O.S.B
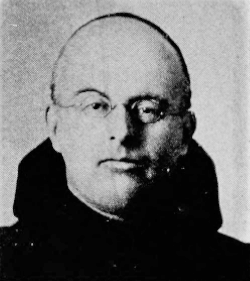
- Born: Reginald Percy John Camm; 26 December 1864; Sunbury-on-Thames, England
- Died: 8 September 1942 (aged 77); Clifton, England
- Burial place: Downside Abbey
- Education: Westminster School; Keble College, Oxford
- Occupations: Monk, martyrologist

Ecclesiastical career
- Religion: Christianity
- Church: Church of England (1888 -1890); Roman Catholic (1891-1931)
- Ordained: 1888 (Church of England); 1891 (Roman Catholic)
- Congregations: St Agnes, Kennington Park

Dom Bede Camm, O.S.B., (26 December 1864 – 8 September 1942) was an English Benedictine monk and martyrologist. He is best known for his many works on the English Catholic martyrs, which helped to keep their memories alive in the newly reemerging Catholic Church of Victorian England.

== Life ==
He was born Reginald Percy John Camm on 26 December 1864 in Sunbury-on-Thames, Surrey (then Middlesex), England, the son of John Brooke Maher Camm, a retired cavalryman of the 12th Royal Lancers and his wife, Caroline Arden. As a youth he was educated first at Westminster School and then at Keble College, Oxford, from which he received a Bachelor of Arts degree in Theology in 1884.

Camm was ordained a minister in the Church of England in 1888, and passed a short period as a curate at St Agnes, Kennington Park. He converted to Roman Catholicism in 1890, received at Maredsous Abbey in Belgium. He was accepted into the novitiate of the abbey on 8 September of that same year and made his first profession as a monk on 8 December 1891. He was then sent to the Pontifical Atheneum of St. Anselm in Rome for further studies, where he was solemnly professed on Christmas Day 1894 and ordained as a Catholic priest on 9 March 1895 at the Basilica of St. John Lateran, by Cardinal Parocchi. Camm was then sent to live at Erdington Abbey; he was one of the first English members in a community of refugee monks from Germany.

Camm developed a strong devotion to the English Martyrs who were being beatified by Pope Leo XIII during that period. He later published a two-volume work called Lives of the English Martyrs, in 1904. While preparing the book, he came to know Mother Mary of St Peter (née Marie-Adèle Garnier), foundress of the Benedictine Adorers of the Sacred Heart of Montmartre. She had just led her new monastic community from Paris, due to the anti-clerical laws recently enacted by Prime Minister Émile Combes. The nuns built a new monastery located in Tyburn, the place of execution of many of the Catholic martyrs of the Tudor period. They opened a small shrine to the martyrs in the crypt of the monastery chapel and became the caretakers of the site. Camm developed a deep respect for the foundress.

In 1909 Camm came to the rescue of the Tyburn nuns. The financial situation of the nuns' monastery had become so severe that they were in process of selling the property, and had already packed. He approached Mother St Peter and offered to help them with a legacy he had received from his father, clearing their debts and funding the construction of a novitiate for their priory. This donation saved the community in its early days, and the site of devotion to England's martyrs. He went on to help develop the site, obtaining more relics and stained glass windows in erecting a larger shrine. It was he who designed a recreation of the Tyburn Tree for the sanctuary of the shrine, as a baldachin over the altar.

From 1912 to 1913 he was at Maredsous Abbey in Belgium. After the corporate conversion of Caldey Abbey to the Catholic Church—among the first of its kind accepted by Rome, at the invitation of the abbot of that monastery, in June 1913 Camm went to serve as their Master of novices. In addition to this work, he spent the next year touring England, lecturing and preaching to raise funds for the support of Caldey and Tyburn. Camm contributed a number of articles on English martyrs to the Catholic Encyclopedia.

Camm's own abbey started to experience problems during the years leading up to World War I, as its situation became precarious due to the overwhelming preponderance of German monks in the community. Thus Camm transferred to Downside Abbey, where he renewed his vows on 21 November 1913 before Abbot Cuthbert Butler. He spent the years of World War I as a military chaplain, posted first at Stobhill Hospital in Glasgow, Scotland, then, in December 1915, in Port Said, Egypt. He served with the military until the spring of 1919.

From 1919 to 1931 Camm served as Master of St Benet's Hall, Cambridge. During that period, he produced further works on the English martyrs and some guides to the surviving locales connected to them. He retired to Downside Abbey in June 1931 due to ill health. Camm was later transferred to a Catholic nursing home in Clifton, Bristol, where he died on 8 September 1942. He was buried in the monastic cemetery of the abbey.

== Works ==
- A Benedictine Martyr in England: being the life and times of the venerable servant of God, Dom John Roberts (1897)
- In the Brave Days of Old: historical sketches of the Elizabethan persecution, (1899)
- Courtier, Monk and Martyr: a sketch of the life and sufferings of Blessed Sebastian Newdigate of the London Charterhouse (1901)
- Lives of the English Martyrs: Declared Blessed by Pope Leo XIII in 1886 and 1895
  - Volume I (1904)
  - Volume II (1905).
- Some Devonshire screens and the saints represented on their panels (1906)
- Tyburn Conferences: Oxford, Douay, Tyburn (1906)
- The Voyage of the "Pax"; An Allegory, (1906)
- A Birthday Book of the English Martyrs (1908)
- William Cardinal Allen (1908)
- Roodscreens and Roodlofts (1909), with Frederick Bligh Bond
- The Martyr-Monk of Manchester, Blessed Ambrose Barlow (1910)
- Forgotten Shrines (1910)
- Heroes of the Faith (1910)
- Sister Mary of St. Francis, S.N.D., with the Hon. Laura Petre (Stafford-Jernigham) (1913)
- A North-Country Martyr (Venerable John Ducket) (1914)
- At the Feet of the King of Martyrs (1916)
- Ven. Dominic Barberi and the conversion of England (1922)
- Pilgrim Paths in Latin Lands (1923)
- The Story of Blessed Thomas More (1926)
- The English Martyrs and Anglican Orders (1929)
- The Good Fruit of Tyburn Tree (1929)
- The English Martyrs; papers from the Summer school of Catholic studies held at Cambridge, 28 July – 6 Aug. 1928 (1929)
- Nine Martyr Monks: the lives of the English Benedictine martyrs beatified in 1929 (1931)
- The Life of Blessed John Wall, O.F.M.: the martyr of Harvington (1932)
- The Foundress of Tyburn Convent (1935)
- Anglican Memories (1935)
- Witnesses to the Holy Mass and Other Sermons (2004)
- The English Martyrs under Henry VIII: I. Fisher and More with Leonard William Longstaff
