= Alonso Berruguete =

Spanish painter, sculptor and architect (c. 1488–1561)

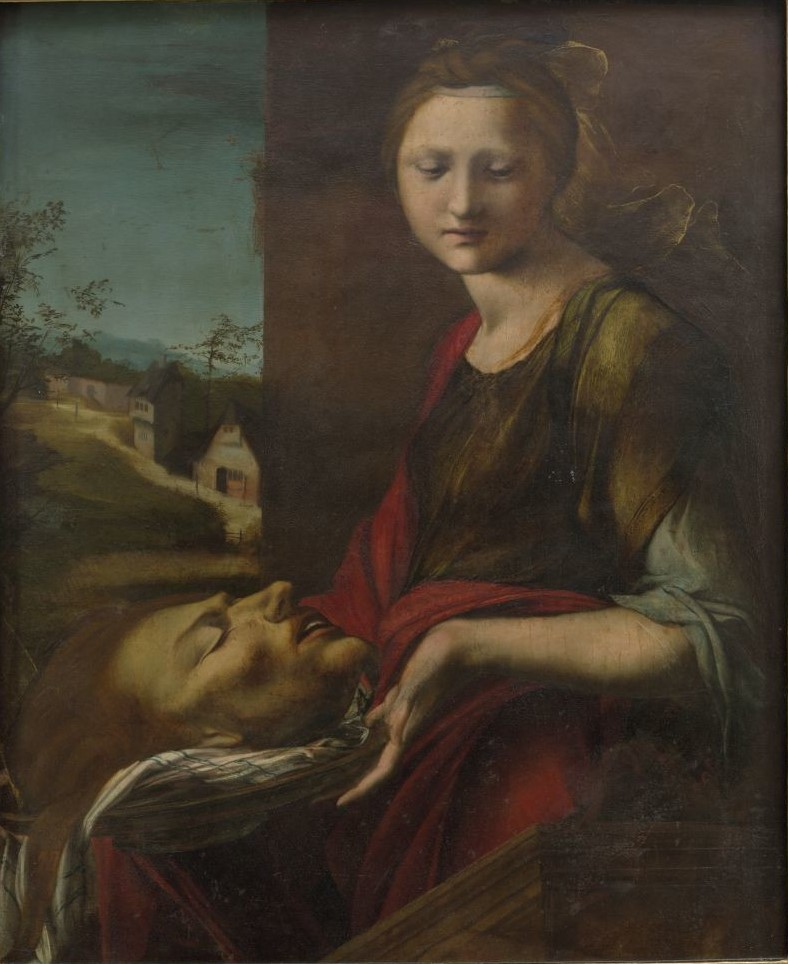
Salome by Alonso Berruguete (1512–16), in the Uffizi Gallery in Florence

Alonso González de Berruguete (c. 1488 – 1561) was a Spanish painter, sculptor and architect. He is considered to be the most important sculptor of the Spanish Renaissance, and is known for his emotive sculptures depicting religious ecstasy or torment.

== Life ==
Born in the town of Paredes de Nava, Berruguete studied art under the tutelage of his father, the painter Pedro Berruguete. His family, however, chose the law for his profession and obtained for him an official position at Valladolid, the title of which he held for years, probably long after he had devoted himself to art. Following his father's death in 1504, Berruguete travelled to Italy to continue his study of art, spending most of his time in Florence and Rome. It is here that he studied sculpture under the Italian master, Michelangelo. His paintings produced in Italy showed a mannerist influence, with his art being compared with contemporaries such as Jacopo Pontormo and Rosso Fiorentino. In Florence he was engaged by the nuns of San Geronimo to finish an altarpiece left unfinished at his death by Filippo Lippi.

Berruguete returned to Spain in 1517, and in 1518, was appointed to the position of court painter and sculptor by Charles V of Spain, who gave him much work to do at Madrid, at the Palace of El Pardo, and at the Alhambra. He carved the relief of the Resurrection in Valencia Cathedral. Because he did not follow the emperor to Germany in 1520, however, he received no royal commissions for paintings. From this point in his career forward, Berruguete concentrated primarily on sculpture. In 1519 he collaborated with Felipe Bigarny on the tomb of Cardinal Juan Selvagio in the Church of Santa Engracia de Zaragoza.

Works of his include an altarpiece at the Irish College at Salamanca (1529–1533), choir stalls at the Cathedral of Toledo (1539–1543) and a tomb for the Archbishop of Toledo Juan de Tavera at the hospital that Tavera founded, the hospital of St. John the Baptist in Toledo (1552–1561).

== Wood sculpture ==
After his training in Italy he went back to the Spanish tradition of making wood sculptures, which included the altarpieces at the church of San Benito el Real, Valladolid. "The exaggerated movements of his figures became a mannerism with his followers Andrés de Nájera, Esteban Jordán, Inocencio Berruguete and others..."

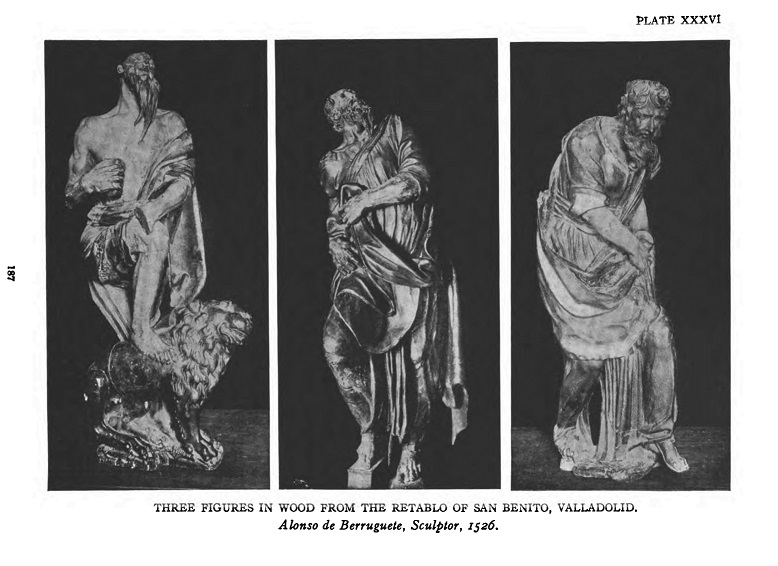

From October 13, 2019 – February 17, 2020, over 40 of Berruguete's painted wood sculptures were on display in the National Gallery of Art, Washington, D.C. as part of an exhibition titled Alonso Berruguette: First Sculptor of Renaissance Spain.
