= The Upside of Down =

The Upside of Down may refer to:

- The Upside of Down (book), a 2006 non-fiction book by Thomas Homer-Dixon
- The Upside of Down (album), a 2012 album by Chris August
- The Up Side of Down: Why Failing Well Is the Key to Success, a 2015 non-fiction book by Megan McArdle

== See also ==
- Upside Down (disambiguation)
