= Doonside =

Doonside may refer to the following places:

- Doonside, New South Wales, Australia
- Doonside, KwaZulu-Natal, South Africa

== See also ==
- Douneside, Aberdeenshire, Scotland
- Downside (disambiguation)
