= Dom Gregory Murray =

British monk and composer (1905–1992)

Dom Gregory Murray OSB (27 February 1905 – 19 January 1992) was a British monk of Downside Abbey, and an organist and composer. His over-riding interest as a musician was to provide music that would enhance the Roman Catholic liturgy.

== Biography ==
=== Early life ===
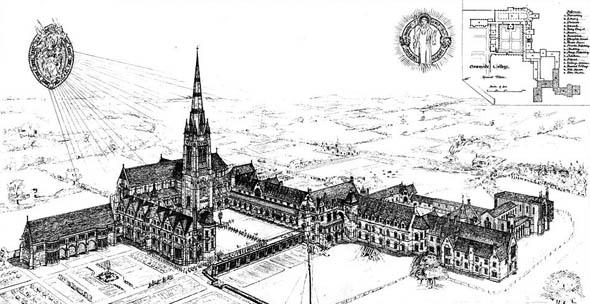
Downside Abbey (1873)

Anthony Murray was born on 27 February 1905 in Fulham, London to Arthur Joseph Mandeville Murray (1870–1909) and his wife Gertrude Mary Murray, nee Santiero (1869–1940). He was educated in the choir school of Westminster Cathedral under the aegis of Sir Richard Terry, and at Ealing Abbey School. In 1923 he began his life as a monk at Downside Abbey, taking the name Gregory. In 1927 he became a Fellow of the Royal College of Organists. In 1929 he graduated from the University of Cambridge with a degree in history.

=== Priest ===
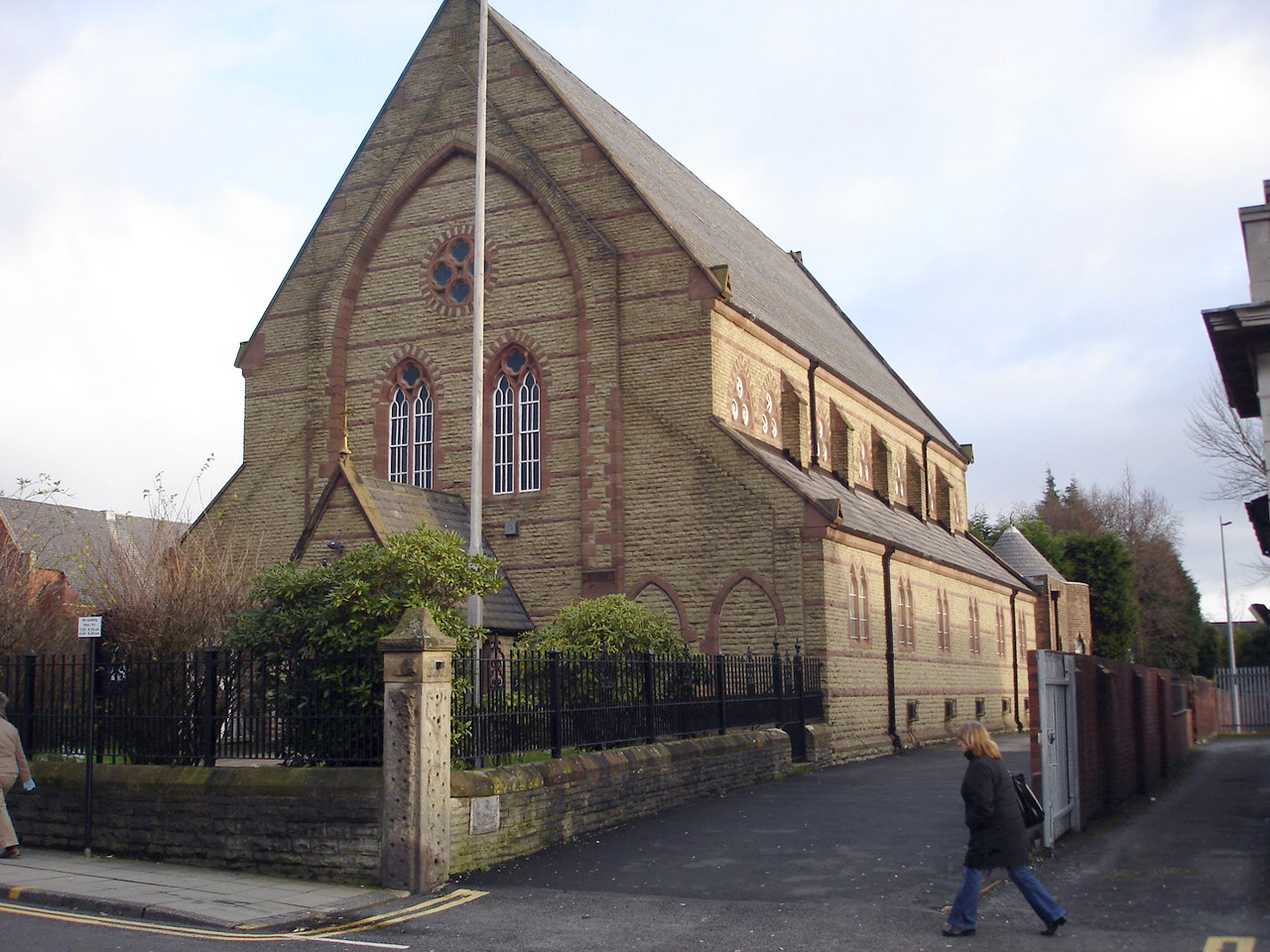
St Benedict's church, Hindley (2009)

Murray was ordained priest at Downside Abbey in Somerset in 1932. He remained a member of the community at Downside although spending some time away from there: periods between 1939 and 1945 at Ealing Abbey, a daughter house of Downside; from 1948 to 1952 as parish priest of St. Benedict's, Hindley, Greater Manchester; and from 1952 to 1987 as parish priest of St Benedict's, Stratton-on-the-Fosse, adjacent to Downside.

=== Liturgical composer ===
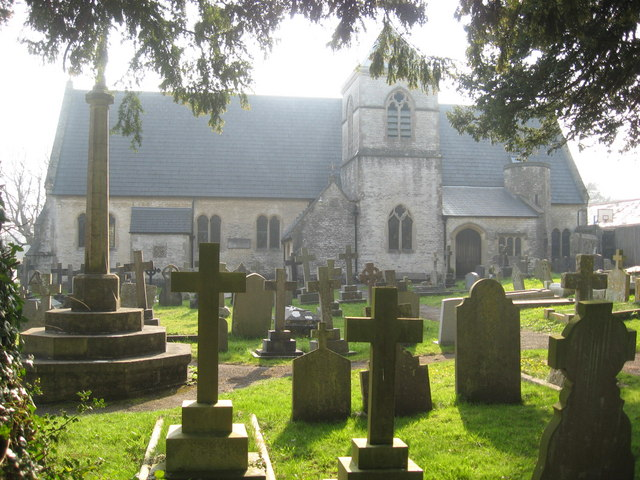
St Benedict's Church, Stratton-on-the Fosse (2009)

Murray made a significant musical contribution to Catholic liturgy in respect of the development of congregational participation, notably in the 1939 Westminster Hymnal, and A People's Mass (1950) with Latin text and in 1975 adapted by the composer to suit post-Vatican II English text with the title 'A New People's Mass'). It is a simple and tuneful setting, with sales of more than two million copies at the time of Murray's death. In 1963, A People's Mass was adapted by John Dykes Bower for Anglican use, with Murray's blessing. It was published as 'A People's Communion Service'. Apart from compositions for the organ and the liturgy there are also some choral works. He also composed and edited much music for, and championed the revival of interest in, the recorder.

=== Liturgical scholar ===
Murray was considered an authority on the liturgical use of plainchant, and published two books on the subject. The first, Gregorian Rhythm (1934), was superseded by the second, Gregorian Chant according to the manuscripts (1964). In this he diverged radically from his earlier work, and the generally accepted Solesmes interpretation of plainchant. He was a keen supporter of the use of the vernacular in Catholic worship, a position illustrated in his Music and the Mass (1967), which discussed the centrality of music in the reformed liturgies being promoted by the Second Vatican Council.

=== Organist ===
As an organist Murray was widely known for his ability to improvise on the organ and he established a national reputation as a recitalist from his regular appearances on the BBC, giving organ recitals from Downside. The Homage to Delius hints at Dom Gregory's prodigious facility for improvisation. However, his duties as a priest and monk inhibited the further development of a performing career.

=== Personal life ===
Aside from his musical activities and religious duties, Murray had a lifelong interest in the Gospel of St Matthew and in playing chess, cricket, football and tennis.

== Works ==
=== Compositions and arrangements ===
==== Oboe ====
- (1957) Oboe Album

==== Organ ====
- (1934) Trumpet finale
- (1935) Short Interludes for Organ, 1–14 (Book 1)
- (1937) Choral prelude : Hail Mary, pearl of grace
- (1937) Short Interludes for Organ, 15–28 (Book 2)
- (1938) Adagio
- (1938) Two Aquarelles (after Delius 'To be sung of a summer night on the water')
- (1946) Short Interludes for Organ, 29–42 (Book 3)
- (1948) Largo man non tanto (after Bach: Concerto for two violins)
- (1952) Short Interludes for Organ, 43–56 (Book 4)
- (1986) Short Interludes for Organ, 57–70 (Book 5)
- (1987) Short Interludes for Organ, 71–85 (Book 6)
- (1987) Short Interludes for Organ, 86–100 (Book 7)
- (1992) Two Delius Pieces: Walk to the paradise garden; Song at sunrise
- (1993) Downside collection: transcriptions for organ
- (1994) Homage to Delius

==== Recorder ====
- (1955) Three trios for recorders: Jacob Obrecht & Hendrik Isaac:
- (1956) Melodies through the Ages
- (1956) Treble and Tenor Duets. By Purcell, Handel, Bach and other masters.
- (1958) Music of Shakespeare's Time
- (1961) Andante (after Bach: Trio Sonata in D minor for organ)
- (1966) Petite suite for recorder quartet
- (1966) The British National Anthem
- (1968) Ricercare (primo tono)
- (1969) Overture to the Beggar's Opera
- (1969) A Toy
- (1969) Two Elizabethan Quintets. From the Fitzwilliam Virginal Book. 1. Barafostus' Dreame. 2. The King's Morisco
- (1969) Two Tudor Self-portraits. From the Fitzwilliam Virginal Book. 1. Dr. Bull's my Selfe. 2. Giles Farnaby his Humour
- (1971) Chanson de Matin
- (1982) 8 consort pieces for recorder quartet

==== Voice(s) ====
- (19??) Missa sanctae Mariae
- (1927) O Bethlehem
- (1935) No greater Love :a carol
- (1937) Balulalow
- (1937) New prince, new pomp: Christmas carol
- (1938) Lulley Jhesu
- (1938) Lullay myn lyking
- (1938) Music
- (1939) Carillon, carilla
- (1939) Drop, drop, slow tears
- (1939) Our Lord and Our Lady
- (1939) The Birds
- (1939) Missa primi toni for six voices
- (1950) A People's Mass (Latin)
- (1951) Vidi aquam : tonus simplex
- (1952) As I wen to Bethlehem
- (1955) Church Year Music
- (1957) Come to Bethlehem
- (1958) A second People's Mass [Latin]
- (1961) The Grail Prayer
- (1963) A People's Communion Service : Anglican liturgy
- (1963) Confirma hoc, Deus
- (1964) Credo iii. Official English text
- (1966) A People's Mass [English]
- (1967) Gregorian psalm-tones for English words
- (1967) Unison Mass in English
- (1969) Magnificat and Nunc dimittis : in unison
- (1970) A Folk Mass
- (1970) A People's Mass [English]
- (1970) An English Congregational Mass
- (1971) Psalm tones
- (1971) Responsorial psalms for the church's year
- (1973) A Unison Setting of Series 3 : adapted for Anglican liturgy by John Dykes Bower
- (1974) Psalms for Sundays
- (1975) A New People's Mass : post Vatican II English text
- (1978) Alleluia, Alleluia, Alleluia : Corpus Christi
- (1989) Psalms for singers : 26 responsorial psalms for congregational use
- (1992) St. Antony Mass : a setting for congregation & SSA choir
- (1999) Catholic supplement : hymns songs & chants

===== Hymnody =====
- (n.d.) Hymn-tune arr. Adoro te
- (n.d.) Hymn-tune arr. Alma redemptoris
- (n.d.) Hymn-tune Confido
- (n.d.) Hymn-tune arr. Creator alme siderum
- (n.d.) Hymn-tune Jucunda laudatio
- (n.d.) Hymn-tune Lux perpetua
- (n.d.) Hymn-tune O king of might and splendour
- (n.d.) Hymn-tune O Queen of heaven
- (n.d.) Hymn-tune Pastor bonus
- (n.d.) Hymn-tune St David
- (n.d.) Hymn-tune arr. Salve regina
- (n.d.) Hymn-tune Sanctissimum
- (n.d.) Hymn-tune Surrextit
- (n.d.) Hymn-tune arr. Swavesy
- (n.d.) Hymn-tune Ubi caritas
- (n.d.) Hymn-tune arr. Une vaine crainte
- (n.d.) Hymn-tune You gave Lord
- (n.d.) Hymn-tune arr. Veni, creator spiritus
- (n.d.) Hymn-tune arr. Veni, sancte spiritus
- (n.d.) Hymn-tune arr. Wiseman

=== Writings ===
- (1937) Characters of the Reformation
- (193?) Gregorian rhythm : a pilgrim's progress
- (1947) The Choral Chants of the Mass
- (1949) The accompaniment of plainsong
- (1956) Plainsong Rhythm. The editorial methods of Solesmes
- (1957) Gregorian rhythm in the Gregorian centuries : the literary evidence
- (1957) Plainsong rhythm
- (1959) Accentual cadences in Gregorian chant
- (1959) The authentic rhythm of Gregorian chant
- (1960) Gelineau psalmody : the intervening syllables
- (1960) The Psalms : a rhythmic restoration leads to a popular revival
- (1961) A Reply to Fr Smits van Waesberghe, S.J concerning 'Rhythmic proportions in early medieval ecclesiastical chant' by P. Jan W.A. Vollaerts
- (1963) Gregorian chant : according to the manuscripts
- (1963) Gregorian chant, according to the manuscripts; Musical supplement
- (1977) Music and the mass : a personal history
- (1987) The origin and purpose of St. Mark's gospel
