= Upside Down (2015 film) =

- Film poster
- Directed by: Kim Dong-bin
- Written by: Lee Jae-yeon
- Produced by: Kason Park; Choi Eun-hee
- Cinematography: Michael Lee; Kang Yoo-bin
- Music by: Kwak Young-kwon
- Production company: Project Together
- Distributed by: Cinemadal
- Release dates: September 2015 (DMZ Docs); April 14, 2016 (South Korea)
- Running time: 65 minutes
- Country: South Korea
- Language: Korean

Upside Down (Korean: 업사이드 다운; RR: Eopsaideu daun) is a South Korean documentary film about the sinking of the MV Sewol, directed by Kim Dong-bin.

The film received funds from a successful Kickstarter campaign.
