= Upside Down (book) =

- Author: Eduardo Galeano
- Publisher: Picador
- Publication date: 1998
- English publication date: 2000
- ISBN: 0312420315

Upside Down: A Primer for the Looking-Glass World (Spanish: Patas Arriba: la Escuela del Mundo al Revés), originally published in Spanish in 1998, was written by Eduardo Galeano, a Uruguayan author who was greatly impacted by the political turmoil during the 20th century military regimes in Latin America. Events such as the Uruguayan military coup forced Galeano into exile in Spain and Argentina; these exiles, in particular, may have been formative in Galeano's life and writing. The ruminations of this book were formed as a result of Galeano's desire to remember the past traumas and as well as to learn from them. Within this piece of nonfiction, he explores themes such as modern education systems, racism, sexism, poverty, economics, work, and societal fear. The pretense of the prose tends to be preoccupied with learning to rethink the contradictions of society; in a moment when outrageous circumstances are normalized, it is time to reconsider the understandings many people hold, which, in turn, informs the way such people view things. Though focusing on Latin America, Galeano uses what he has learned from the political and social environment within Latin America to understand injustices and social dynamics throughout the rest of the world.

== Form ==
In Upside Down, Galeano makes a set of rhetorical and visual choices that expose the intentions of his book. Beginning with the title, Upside Down: A Primer for the Looking-Glass World, Galeano uses the term "primer" to convey the educational goals of the book. Later on he uses the term "practicum" to reinforce such goals. Primer, in this case, both indicates Galeano’s wish for this to be the initial textbook that engenders a new structure of thought and also suggests a secondary meaning; he views Upside Down as a text that provides a clear foundation. Galeano's prose is accessible to intellectuals as well as non intellectuals; many examples are developed in very clear and simple terms. His desire to change his readers' manner of thinking is shown through the accessibility of this non-fiction piece. Furthermore, small drawings, such as the one seen to the left, occupy the pages of this text. The text and image is reminiscent of introductory textbooks and picture books. Overall, Galeano's choices seem to always enhance accessibility.

== Summary ==
Upside Down presents the relationship between developed (or “first world”) and developing (or “third world”) nations, illuminating the influences of the colonizer over the colonized. Seeing life as "upside down" becomes the central metaphor for looking at experiences throughout the book. Galeano’s epigraph clues the reader into this by farcically posturing Al Capone, as an authority on honor, law, and virtue. It is frightening that Capone delivers a truthful message about the realistic and corrupt state of affairs, given the business he works in. Upending experience calls into question structures we imagine as unchangeable and factual. Galeano suggests that we can start to understand our perceptions of power as based from media interpretations when these "facts" are turned upside down again and forced to stand on their own, inherently dropping all media constructed falsities. Common views of power and hierarchy within societies, institutions, and media begin to look less believable when held against the raw numbers Galeano presents to his readers. Galeano also challenges the First World, eurocentric readers with the question of why Europe and America are always presented on the top of the world, and why can't Latin America and Australia and Africa be seen as the top of the world? The method of questioning also forces his readers to critically analyze themselves and their roles in these power dynamics.

=== Education ===
Galeano begins his analysis with the students, and eventually looks at the role of teachers in the classroom. Finally he moves to the employment industry, analyzing the lessons learned from commercialism and from the general society. He divides the students into social class based on familial economic standings and sees the futures of students based on these economic standings as being pre-set. Poor kids are disrespected for being poor, rich kids are respected for being rich, and rich and poor kids end up in the same position as their parents. Further distinguishing between the social classes, he explains that rich children in Latin America never experience the city they live in; they live in a sheltered, private, improved version of it. Galeano claims that these children see their own societies "as a threat," and therefore are "stripped of cultural identity". Poor children, on the other hand, are "dodging real bullets" and "little slaves in the family economy of in the informal sector of the global economy". In Latin American society, poor children are seen as potential disasters after they are victimized in child labor, the sex trade and sweat shop labor. Galeano demonstrates that the current system of "education" locks poor children in their social space in ways that often cause additional social grief. Galeano shares the personal story of a street kid who looks to drugs to rid himself of all the problems he faces in his daily life of poverty. Meanwhile, the children that lie somewhere between rich and poor taught the "fear of living, fear of falling, fear of losing your job, your car, your home, your possessions, fear of never having what you ought to have in order to be". Teachers, after the redistribution of jobs so that jobs are now almost all temporary, have had to accept that teaching "does not pay". Galeano points out that it is counterintuitive to be financially unappreciative of those who are greatly involved in forming the next generation of workers and citizens.

=== Racism, Sexism, and Poverty ===
People are drawn to capitalism with the promise of choice, but as Galeano points out, those who are allowed to actually make those choices are limited often by money, gender, and race."This world, which puts on a banquet for all, then slams the door in the noses of so many, is simultaneously equalizing and unequal: equalizing in the ideas and habits it imposes and unequal in the opportunities it offers". Some of the ideas that Galeano puts forward as equalized are of what systems to reward and what to fear. For example, failure is condemned while injustices are often overlooked as a mere fact of life. Fear has taught us to look towards furthering security instead of justice. For example, Galeano references the relief that most feel every time a criminal is killed, therefore choosing security over justice. Furthermore, Galeano points out that the idea of "equalization" works against the beauty of variant individual identities and cultural identities, molding numerous people into a common identity that fits better with today's capitalistic society. As globalization continues, the difference between the rich and the poor of the world just keeps growing, and with this increased polarization has come a new vocabulary of degradation to describe class and racial differences.

=== Economics ===
The system of economics, explains Galeano, seems to be dichotomized these days: "You have a job or you have nothing", "What is rewarded above is punished below", "Profits are privatized, losses are socialized". Global corporations take all the power over workers by threatening to move the business to another third world location at the slightest complaint. Despite the abolition of slavery throughout the world, there is a new type of slavery that has taken power, "wage slavery." This references the type of pay that is just high enough to keep the workers in need of the job they have, but always low enough to keep the workers in a constant state of "humiliation". Galeano further problematizes the idea of the economy by suggesting the connection between the choices made by the military as made in reference to economic growth. "Good news for the military economy, which is to say, good news for the economy: the weapons industry, selling death, exporting violence, is flourishing".

== Ideological consistency ==
The ideology presented in Upside Down reflects both Galeano’s contemporary, public rhetoric and the ideas behind the movements with which he is involved. Endorsing egalitarian social conditions, Galeano continues to reiterate one of the fundamental messages found in Upside Down, i.e. that control must be placed over the global forces that influence people’s lives. In a recent manifesto issued by a prominent group of leftists, Galeano, along with other leading activists such as Naomi Klein, demonstrated his cries for increased democratization over the global institutions that influence many aspects of people’s lives. Focusing on what Upside Down poses as one of the most controversial systems in the world, the manifesto addresses the international financial system, calling to democratize globalist organizations and institutions such as the IMF, the WTO, multinational banks, G8/G20, and the European Central Bank. Seeking to deconstruct the imperialist dominance that such establishments embody and perpetuate to the end of great inequality, both racial and social, the manifesto declares, “We are all born equal, rich or poor, woman or man. Every African and Asian is equal to every European and American. Our global institutions must reflect this, or be overturned.” These words as well as those written in Upside Down precede what Galeano describes as “the birth of another world.” Occupy movements around the world vocalize the messages conveyed in Upside Down. Though the world remains rotten, “there is another world in this [world’s] belly that is waiting” Galeano declares. “I see it in these spontaneous… demonstrations.”
