= San Benito el Real, Valladolid =

Church in Valladolid, Spain

Coordinates: 41.6542°N 4.7294°W

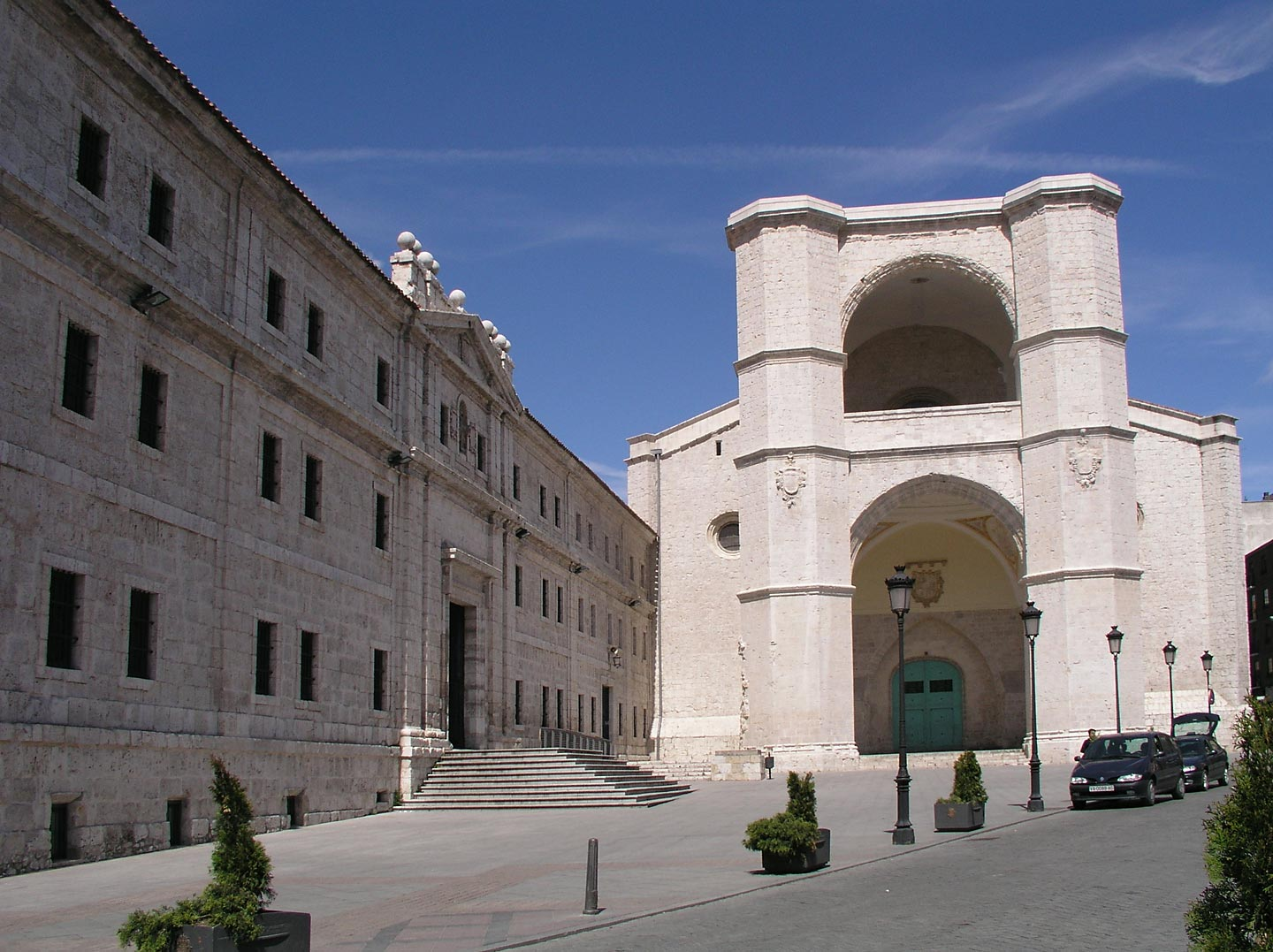
Current facade of the Church of San Benito el Real.

The Church of the Monastery of San Benito el Real is a parish church and former Benedictine monastery located in the city of Valladolid, Castile and León, Spain.

== History ==
The church was erected at the site of the old Royal Alcázar of Valladolid and designed originally in Gothic style; although the façade, with its gate-tower shape, was designed in 1569 in a Renaissance-influenced style by Rodrigo Gil de Hontañón. Originally, the towers flanking the entrance were considerably taller, but these were shortened in the 19th century due to concerns about their structural integrity.

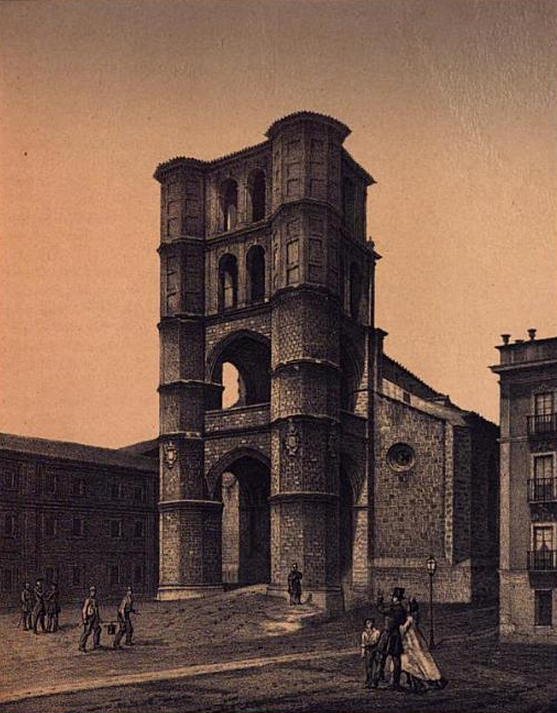
Drawing of the church before the 19th-century alteration of the two bodies of the bell tower.

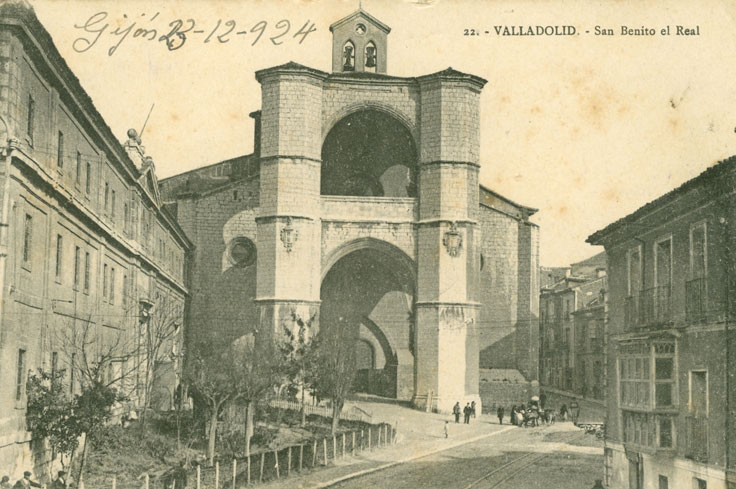
1924 photograph of the church.

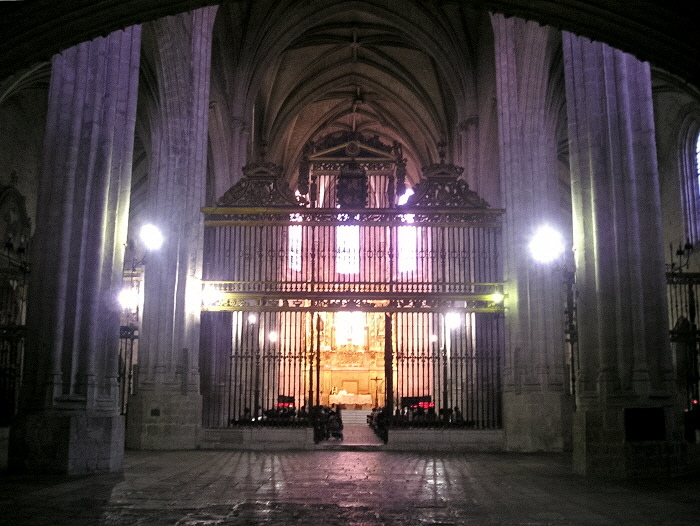
The interior viewed from the base, with the fence.

The church was built using stone from 1499 to 1515, following plans of Juan de Arandia and García de Olave. It is organized by three naves, which end in three polygonal apses without a crossing. The aisles are tall, with minimal height difference with the center nave, creating a space that suggests a single church-hall, more common in the first half of the 16th century.

The interior is lit through large oculi, that open in the wall of the lateral nave of the side of the Epistle and in the apses. Originally, there were also some holes in the central nave, but these were covered when the roofs were raised around 1580. The high choir covers the three naves of the church.

The exterior of the building has thick walls of limestone (extracted from quarries near Valladolid, like Villanubla, Zaratán or Campaspero) and large windows that illuminate the spacious interior. The side facades are articulated by buttresses that counteract the thrust of the vaults with terceletes with which it is covered on the inside. The pillars that divide the naves are baquetonates. The sections at the head of the church have decorated capitals and cornices, which are absent elsewhere. This may be due to the search for a cheaper budget as the work proceeded from the head, according to the medieval custom.

== Interior decoration ==
As the Benedictines had much power and this was their main house in Castile, the church held artworks of high quality. These included the altarpiece and the choir stalls, in the central nave.

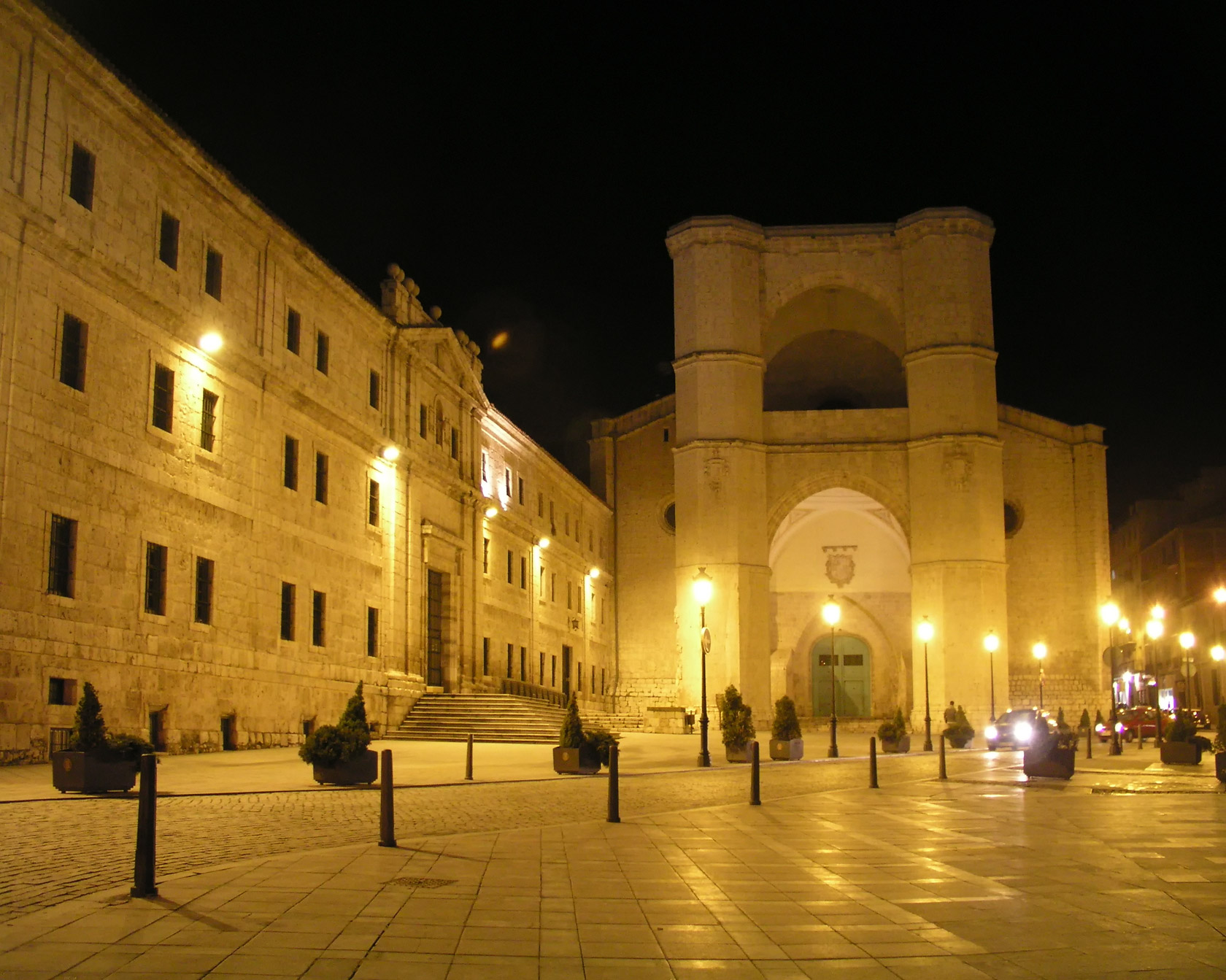
San Benito at night.

The choir stalls (1528) were sculpted by Andrés de Nájera, with low and high chairs. The stalls were used for the annual meetings of the Benedictine abbots of the Castilian monasteries, which took place in this church. The backs of high chairs depict the saints to whom the Spanish Benedictine houses were dedicated, allowing each abbot to find their seat. The style of the stalls is Plateresque. The style to the Roman from Italy had only recently arrived in Spain. Some decorations are based on paintings in Rome's Domus Aurea; the images of saints depart from prior Gothic models.

In 1571 an iron grille was erected, covering the three naves and dividing the church into two parts: the front for common people, and the apse for the monks. The fence is by Tomás Celma and is of high quality.

There were other works of art of great value: small altars, tombs, organs, and others.

After the Ecclesiastical Confiscation of Mendizábal in 1835, the monastery became a fort and barracks, and the church was deconsecrated. It was stripped of its works of art, though the choir stalls were kept, and the altarpiece transferred to the National Museum of Sculpture in the Colegio de San Gregorio, Valladolid. The fence however remains and has not suffered damage. From the mid-19th-century many people called for the church's reopening, which occurred in 1892, under the Venerable Third Order of the Carmel's administration. Since 1897 it is the Order of the Barefoot Carmelite which takes care of the church. In 1922 was installed a Baroque altarpiece to replace the former, from a church of the town of Portillo, Castile and León.

Adjacent to the church is the monastic building with three cloisters; one of them known as Patio Herreriano, now a museum of contemporary art, and a Mannerist main facade designed by Juan Ribero de Rada.

At present, the prior of the convent is Juan Jesús Sánchez Sánchez, from Convento de Padres Carmelitas in Medina del Campo.

=== Elements preserved in National Museum of Sculpture ===
Parts of the monastery's altarpiece are now in the National Museum of Sculpture in Valladolid, the rest having been lost or destroyed by the Confiscation. The altarpiece was made by Alonso Berruguete between 1526 and 1532.

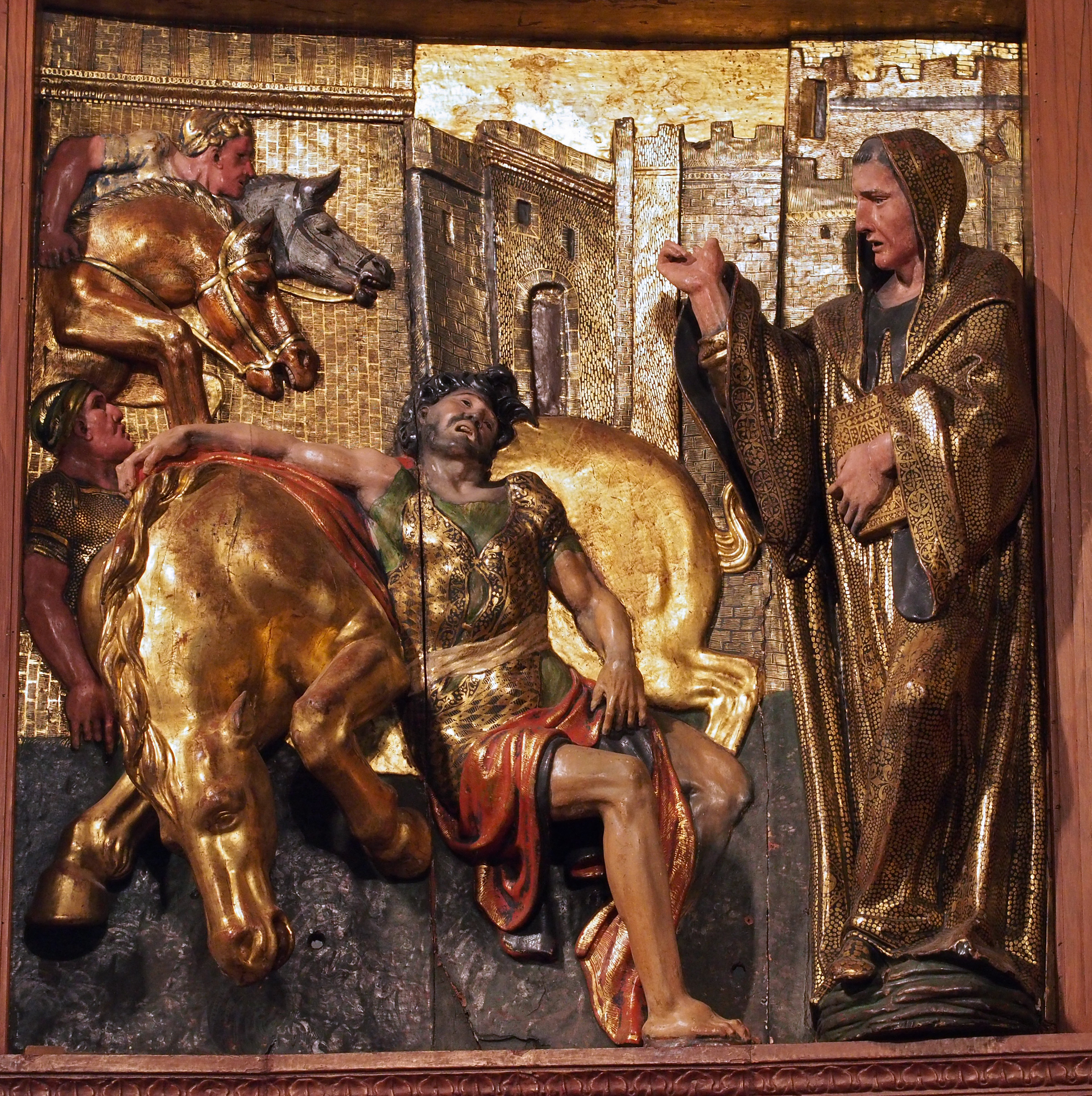
A relief of the altarpiece

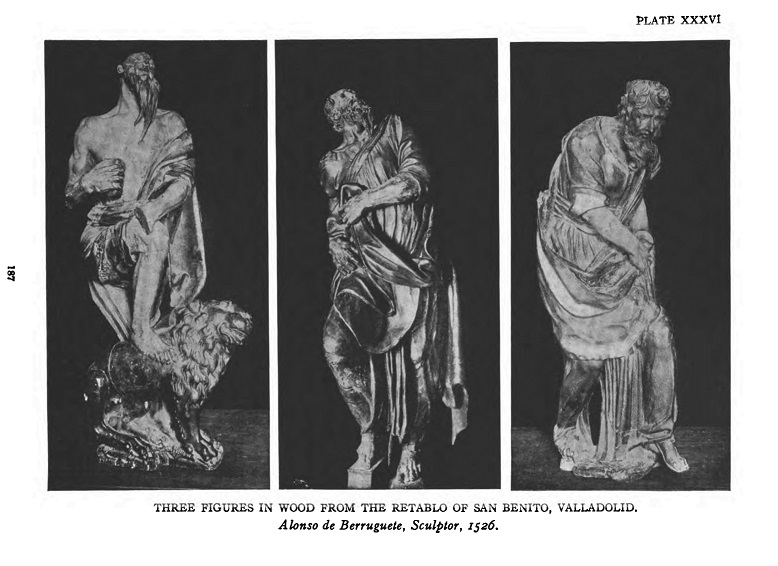
Three figures in wood by Alonso de Berruguete

== Bibliography ==
- María del Rosario Olivera Arranz (2002). "Valladolid". Encyclopedia of the Romanesque in Castile and León: Valladolid. Aguilar de Campoo: Fundación Santa María la Real - Centro de Estudios del Románico. pp. 433–438. ISBN 978-84-89483-22-4. 1nFDEol8FO4C&pg=PA433.
