= Downside Abbey =

Benedictine monastery in Somerset, England

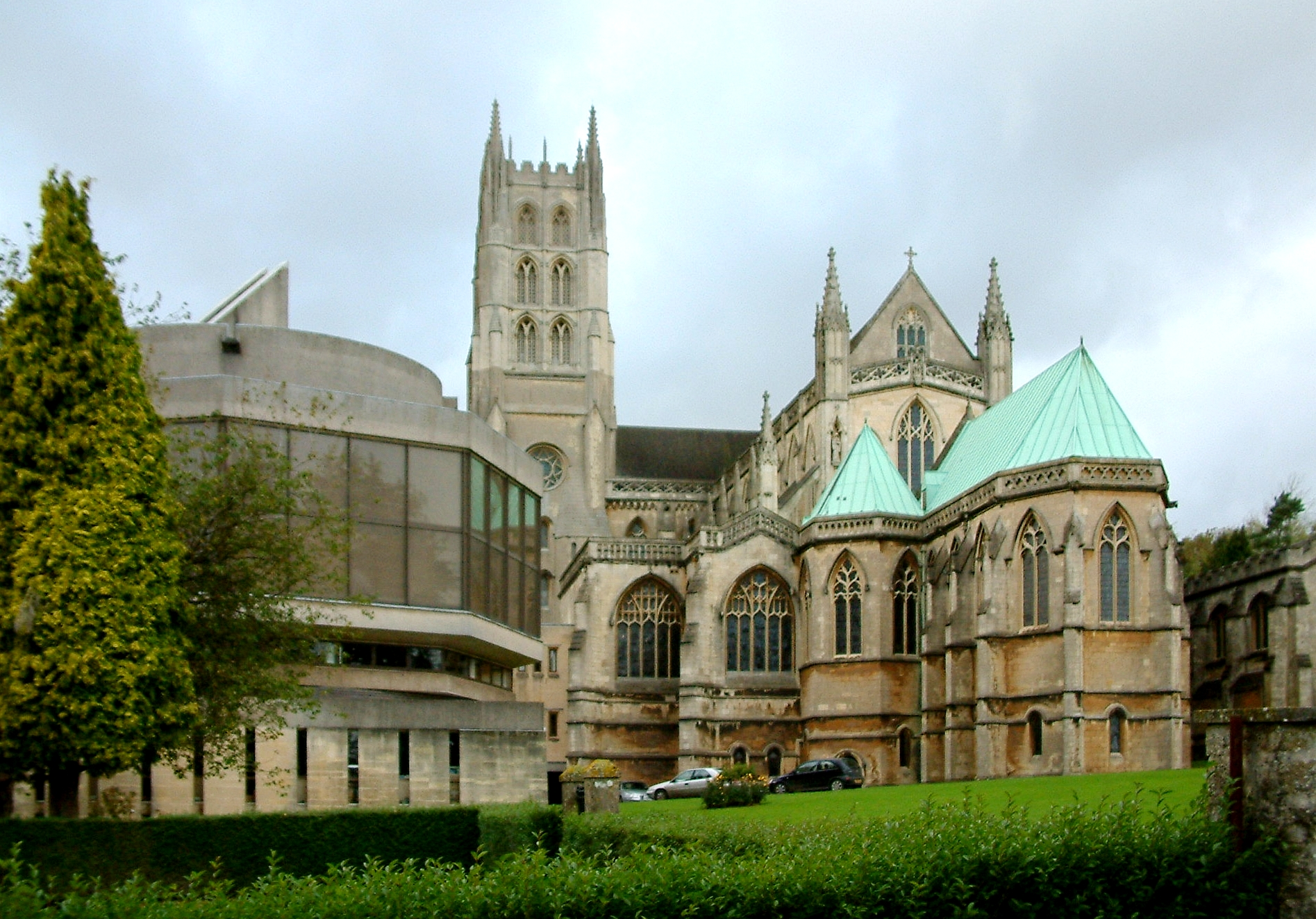
- Abbey monastic basilica and library (left)

- Location within Somerset

Monastery information
- Full name: Abbey of St Gregory the Great at Downside
- Order: Benedictine
- Denomination: Roman Catholicism
- Established: 1606
- Mother house: Valladolid
- Dedication: Gregory the Great
- Diocese: Clifton
- Controlled churches: St Benedict's Church, Stratton-on-the-Fosse; Church of the Holy Ghost, Midsomer Norton; St Francis Xavier's Church, Hereford

People
- Founder: St John Roberts OSB
- Abbot: Dom Nicholas Wetz OSB
- Important associated figures: Architects Archibald Matthias Dunn and Edward Joseph Hansom, Cardinal Gasquet, Ambrose Barlow

Architecture
- Style: Gothic Revival
- Completed date: 1935

Site
- Location: Belmont Abbey, Herefordshire, England (until 13 March 2022 – Stratton-on-the-Fosse, Somerset, England)
- Coordinates: 51.2556°N 2.4954°W
- Grid reference: ST 655 508
- Other information: Relics of St Oliver Plunkett and St Thomas de Cantilupe
- Website: www.downsideabbey.co.uk

Downside Abbey is a former Benedictine monastery in England and the senior community of the English Benedictine Congregation. Until 2019, the community had close links with Downside School, for the education of children aged 11 to 18. Both the abbey and the school are at Stratton-on-the-Fosse, between Westfield and Shepton Mallet in Somerset, South West England. In 2020, the community of Downside Abbey consisted of 15 monks. The community left the abbey in 2022, moving first to Devon and then in 2025 to Belmont Abbey, Herefordshire.

The Abbey Church of St Gregory the Great, begun in 1873 and unfinished, is a Grade I listed building; Sir Nikolaus Pevsner described its Gothic Revival style as "a splendid demonstration of the renaissance of Roman Catholicism in England". As of 2025, the monastic buildings on the Downside site are largely vacant.

== History ==
=== Foundation and development ===
The community was founded in 1607 at Douai in Flanders, then part of the Spanish Netherlands, under the patronage of St Gregory the Great (who had sent the monk, St Augustine of Canterbury, as head of a mission to England in 597). The founder was the Welshman St John Roberts, who became the first prior and established the new community with other monks from England who had entered various monasteries within the Spanish Benedictine Congregation, notably the principal monastery at Valladolid. In 1611 Dom Philippe de Caverel, abbot of St Vaast's Abbey at Arras, built and endowed a monastery for the community.

The Priory of St Gregory was therefore the first English Benedictine house to renew conventual life after the Reformation, thus it has the status of the senior community of the English Benedictine Congregation. For nearly 200 years the monastery trained monks for the English mission and six of these men were beatified by Pope Pius XI in 1929. Two of them, Saints John Roberts and Ambrose Barlow, were among the Forty Martyrs of England and Wales canonised by Pope Paul VI in 1970.

French troops invaded Flanders during the French Revolution. The monastic community was expelled by them, after a period of imprisonment, and in March 1795 the community was permitted to proceed to England. They settled for some 20 years as guests of Sir Edward Smythe at Acton Burnell, Shropshire, before finally settling at a manor house called Mount Pleasant, at Downside, Somerset, in 1814.

The monastery was completed in 1876. Downside was granted Abbey status in 1899 (with Ampleforth and Douai) and Prior Edmund Ford was elected the first Abbot in 1900.

=== 21st century ===
In 2018–2020, following an investigation of Downside School by the Independent Inquiry into Child Sexual Abuse, financial strain on the abbey led to the sale of assets including Renaissance paintings.

Dom Nicholas Wetz of Belmont Abbey was appointed as Prior Administrator for a two-year period from September 2018, and in August 2020 he was elected the first Abbot of Downside Abbey in six years. In the same week, it was announced that the monks would begin the search for a new home due to "smaller numbers and changing circumstances" rendering the current building unsuitable for the future; in that year there were 15 monks. In the spring of 2022, the community moved to the temporary accommodation of "Southgate House, in the grounds of Buckfast Abbey, Devon, where we will live as the Community of St Gregory the Great".

This left vacant the monastery, which once housed a 50-strong community. By 2025, Downside School had repurposed the refectory into a sixth form centre.

In March 2025, it was announced that the Community of St Gregory the Great would transfer in the upcoming summer, for a trial period of two years, to Belmont Abbey in Herefordshire. Although the two Benedictine communities will live together, they will remain separate entities for the time being. This transfer was completed in July 2025.

== Abbey church ==
Downside Abbey
- Minor basilica and abbey church of St Gregory the Great
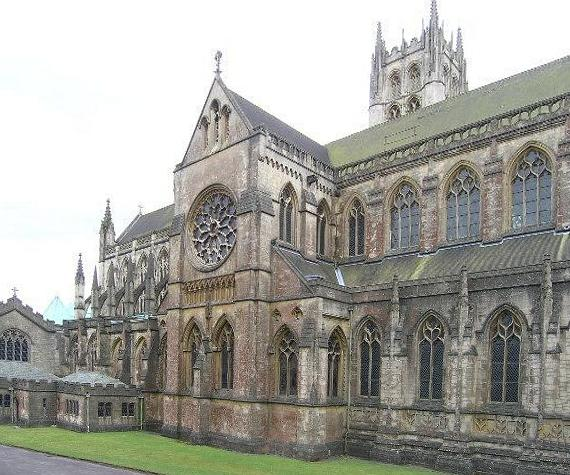
- A view of the monastic church
- Downside Abbey
- Location: Stratton-on-the-Fosse, Shepton Mallet, Somerset
- Country: England
- Denomination: Roman Catholic
- Tradition: Roman Rite

History
- Status: Minor basilica
- Founded: 1814
- Consecrated: 1935

Architecture
- Functional status: Used as a chapel by Downside School
- Architect(s): Archibald Matthias Dunn, Edward Joseph Hansom, Thomas Garner
- Style: Gothic Revival
- Years built: 1873–1925
- Completed: 1925

Administration
- Province: Birmingham
- Metropolis: Birmingham
- Archdiocese: Birmingham
- Diocese: Clifton

Clergy
- Abbot: Dom Nicholas Wetz

Listed Building – Grade I
- Reference no.: 1058633

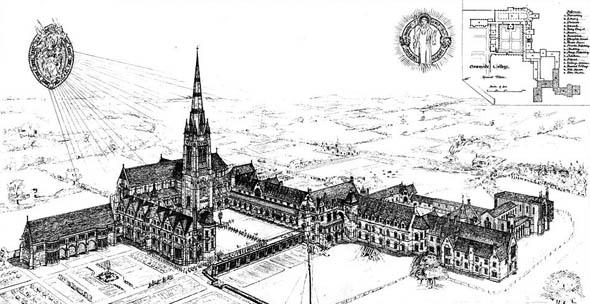
Perspective view of Downside Abbey as envisioned in 1873, from the firm of Dunn & Hansom

=== Construction ===
The building of Downside abbey church began in 1873 with the transepts and the Lady Chapel. The foundation stone was laid on 1 October 1873 and the ceremony was reported in the Bath Chronicle and Weekly Gazette on 9 October 1873:

Yesterday week the foundation stones of the new church and collegiate and monastic buildings were laid amidst much ceremonial. Archbishop Manning presided at the ceremony, and he was accompanied by Bishop Clifford of Clifton, The Bishop of Newport and Menevia, the Cistercian Abbot of Mount St Bernard's, Leicestershire, Monsignor Capel, Monsignor Parfitt, Dr. Neve, the Vicar-General of the Diocese, Dr. Williams, President of Prior Park College, and among the Benedictine clergy, to which Order Downside belongs, was the Very Revd. Dr. Sweeney, of Bath. The ceremony commenced with Pontifical High Mass, celebrated by Dr. Clifford. After the Gospel the Archbishop preached, taking as his text, "One body and one spirit", Eph iv 4. After Mass, the music of which was strict Gregorian, a procession was formed and moved through the grounds of the college to the spot where the stones to be laid were prepared. The chief stone, forming the base of the north transept of the church, was laid by Archbishop Manning; the stone of the college by the Bishop of Clifton, and that of the monastery by the Bishop of Newport. At the end of the ceremony about £100 were laid upon the stone, but in addition to that promises of contributions were very liberal. At the conclusion of the religious part of the day's proceedings the Benedictine Fathers entertained the visitors, numbering about 200, at a luncheon laid out in the exhibition room of the college. The style of the new building, the architects of which are Messrs. Dunn and Hansom, of Newcastle, is mediaeval Gothic. The church, it is said, will be exceptionally grand, and with its lofty tower and spire will be a striking object to all the neighbourhood. The building is to be constructed of stone from the neighbouring quarries at Doulting, which it may be mentioned furnished the material of the structure of Wells Cathedral and Glastonbury Abbey. The present Benedictine community purchased about 70 acres of land at Downside in the year 1814, and removed thither from Acton Burnell in Shropshire. By degrees they have increased their property to some 350 acres, and are known to have the best cultivated farms in their part of the county of Somerset.

In 1925, the unfinished nave was dedicated to the former pupils of the school killed in World War I.

=== Consecration ===
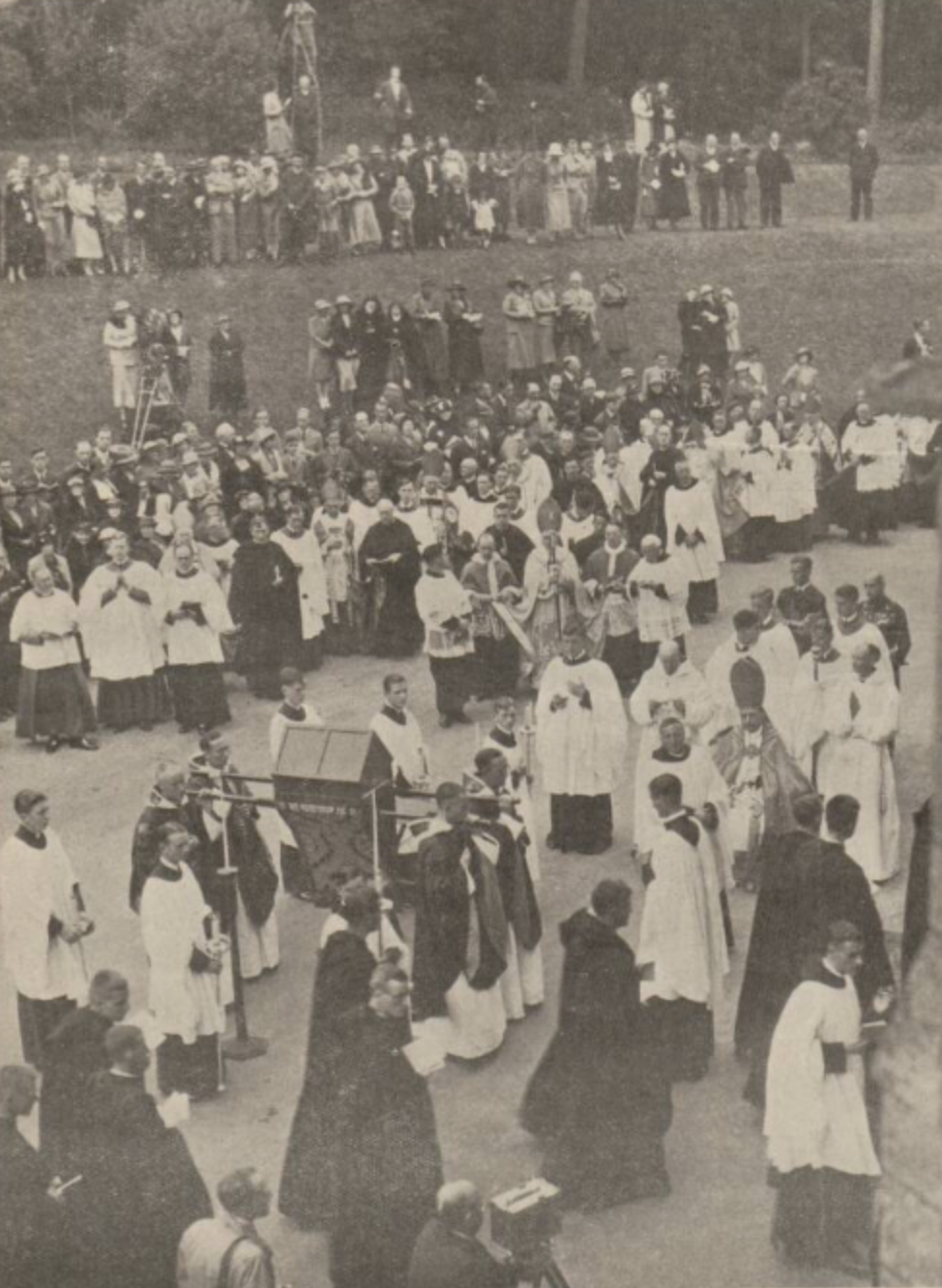
Consecration of the Abbey: the procession of relics towards the west door

The abbey church was consecrated in 1935. At the same time it was raised to the rank of a minor basilica by Pope Pius XI. The consecration was reported in the Wells Journal for 13 September 1935.

To-day, with the full solemnity of Catholic ritual, Downside Abbey, which was commenced more than a half-a-century ago, was consecrated by the Cardinal Prince-Primate of Hungary, Monsignor Seredi, who is one of the Benedictine Members of the Sacred College. The ceremony was attended by Cardinal MacRory from Ireland, seven Archbishops, twelve Bishops and fifteen Abbots. Over 500 priests accepted invitations to attend and among the lay guests were the Lord Mayor of London and leading members of the Roman Catholic community throughout Great Britain. In honour of the occasion the Abbey Church has been raised by the Pope to the dignity of the Minor Basilica – the first in England – and this confers upon the Abbot the right to wear the Cappa Magna, a long black cloak. Cardinal Seredi, who directly represented the Pope, consecrated the High Altar and performed the greater part of the consecration of the church, the building of which has cost over £200,000.

=== Status ===
The church houses the relics of St Oliver Plunkett, archbishop of Armagh, an Irish martyr, executed at Tyburn in 1681, who entrusted the disposal of his body to the care of a Benedictine monk of the English Benedictine Congregation. The church is one of only four in the United Kingdom to be designated a minor basilica by the Roman Catholic Church, the others being St Chad's Cathedral in Birmingham, the National Shrine of Our Lady at Walsingham in Norfolk, and Corpus Christi Priory, Manchester.

=== Description ===
The church is built in the Gothic Revival style, in Bath stone ashlar with plain red tile roofs; the east chapels are roofed in copper sheeting. It is designed to rival in size the medieval cathedrals of England that were lost to the Catholic Church through the Reformation. The earliest part is the decorated transepts by Archibald Matthias Dunn and Edward Joseph Hansom, dating from 1882.

The choir is the work of Thomas Garner (who is buried there), and was opened on 20 September 1905, when the monks celebrated a Requiem Mass for all of the deceased members of the community.

The nave by Giles Gilbert Scott (c. 1923–25) remains unfinished, with its western wall in crude Lias stone standing bare and undecorated. Scott also reordered the quire in 1934, when the original high altar was turned into the Blessed Sacrament altar and a new altar placed three steps west on a slightly lower elevation; the stools were replaced and modelled of the ones from Chester Cathedral. This arrangement lasted until the decrees of the Second Vatican Council and so in 1968 Francis Pollen redesigned the sanctuary so that the high altar was brought forward and the choir stools were moved backwards.

The Lady chapel is acknowledged as one of the most complete and successful schemes of Sir Ninian Comper, with a reredos and altar furnishings incorporating medieval fragments and a reliquary containing the skull of St Thomas de Cantilupe. The tower, completed in 1938, at 166 feet (55 m), is the second highest in Somerset. The building, together with the attached north part of the cloister, was designated as Grade I listed in 1986.

=== Organs ===
==== G. P. England organ ====
The first pipe organ at Downside was built in 1805 by George Pike England of Tottenham Court Road for the Music Room in Brighton Pavilion; when removed in 1882 (without its original case) to the south transept gallery of the new church, it had 16 stops over two manuals and pedals. Removed to the Church of St Vigor in nearby Stratton-on-the-Fosse in 1907, it survives today somewhere in America, having been sold following water damage sustained in Stratton in 1969.

==== Garrard organ ====
The England organ was to be replaced in 1905 with a new instrument by Garrard of Lechlade, consisting of three manuals and 55 speaking stops: it was supplied two years later by the renamed firm of Garrard, Spooner & Amphlett, but was never completed satisfactorily.

==== Compton organ ====
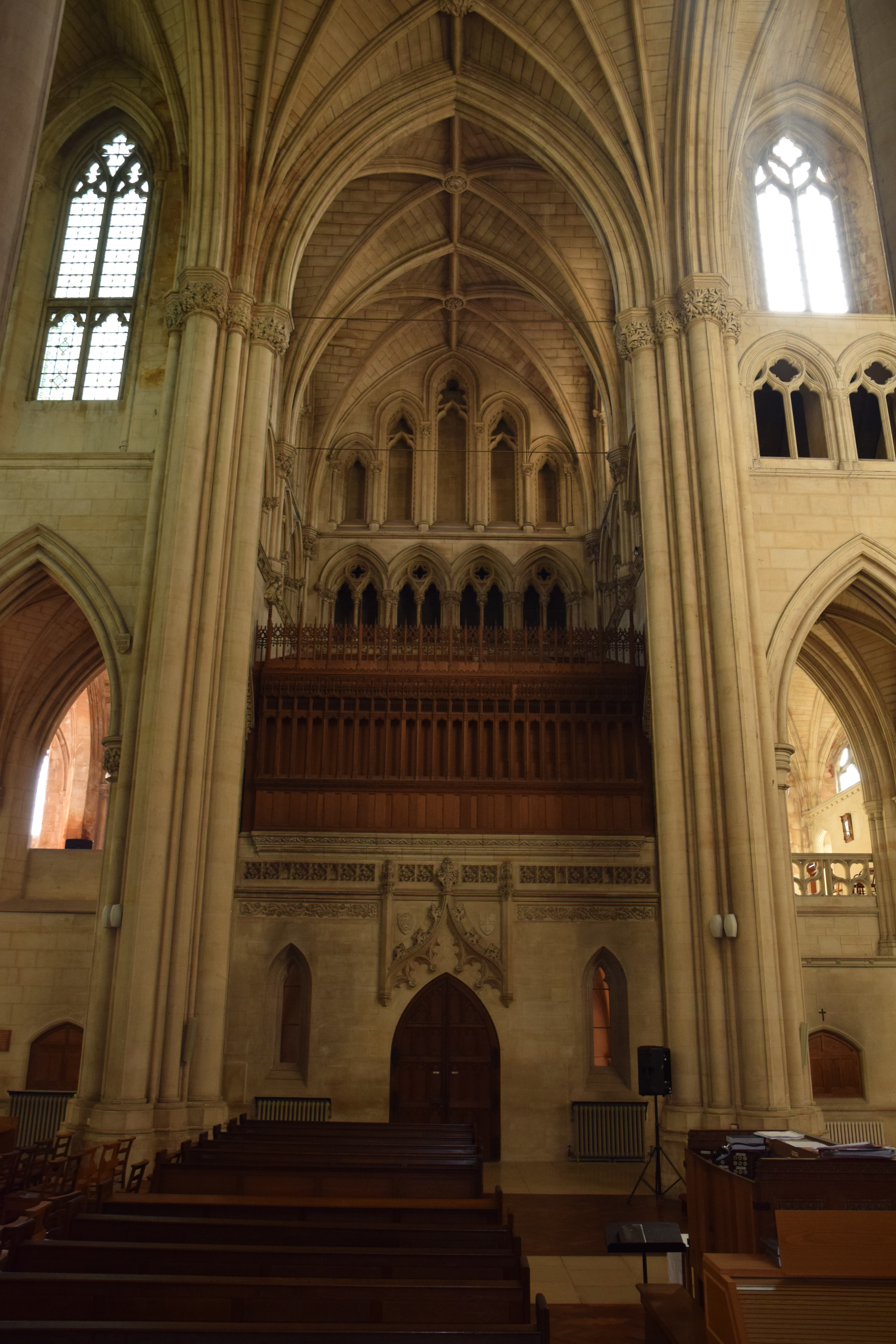
Organ case in the gallery above the south transept

The current organ in the abbey church was built by John Compton in 1931 to replace the Garrard organ: it has 142 speaking stops over four manuals and pedals. This extraordinarily large number of stops is derived from 38 ranks of pipes by means of extension and transmission. The whole instrument is enclosed within three stone and concrete chambers with swell shutters facing upwards, except the Tuba box which speaks down into the transept. Unusually, the casework (designed by Giles Gilbert Scott and carved by Ferdinand Stuflesser of Ortesei in the Italian Tyrol) has no pipe fronts: it is of solid oak with fretwork, but has no roof: consequently, the whole organ speaks up into the transept vaults and is projected down the nave. The console, a typical Compton luminous stop button affair which faces west from near the crossing down the north side of the nave, is made from timber from HMS Bellerophon, which transported Napoleon after the Battle of Waterloo.

== Monastery ==
An early addition to the site was the small single-storey lodge at the east entrance, built in 1827 in a plain Grecian style, to designs assumed to be by the eminent architect Henry Goodridge. The adjacent gatepiers in Gothic Revival style by E. J. Hansom were added in 1871.

The monastery and attached cloisters were completed in 1873, except for the south end which was completed in 1899. As with the first phase of the church the architects were A. M. Dunn and E. J. Hansom, and construction is in Bath stone under red tile, in a style described by English Heritage as "collegiate High Victorian". The west front has three storeys, rising to four at the south end, and a later attic floor; there are four gables and the central entrance is under a half-projecting two-storey octagonal tower with a conical roof. The east front is obscured by the library of 1971, and a 1975 wing providing a refectory and guest accommodation, both designed by the Brett and Pollen partnership. The monastery, including a single-storey cloister linking it to the school, was designated as Grade II* listed in 1986, and the 1975 east wing was added to the designation in 2024.

== Library ==
The Monastery's collections consist of some 450,000 books, incunabula, manuscripts and periodicals, held alongside the archives of the English Benedictine Congregation. The collection of medieval manuscripts has been described as "the most important in the South West of England". The collections are housed in a six-storey octagonal building designed in 1960s style by Francis Pollen (an alumnus of Downside School) and completed in 1971. When the library was designated as Grade II listed in 2024, it was described as "a highly imaginative building ... with high-quality workmanship; ... good quality joinery and cabinetry throughout".

Following a Heritage Lottery Fund grant of £856,000 in 2013, the archives opened to the public, and much of the collection of rare books and manuscripts was digitised. The grant also enabled repair and improvement of the library building.

In March 2017, it was reported that the Abbey was to publish a copy of a Georgian recipe book from 1793 that was discovered in its library in 2016. Amongst other items, it included one of the earliest known UK recipes for curry. It also chronicles day-to-day life at Begbrook House near Bristol.

== Cemetery ==
The Abbey Cemetery, primarily a burial ground for the community, also contains two war graves of World War II: a Lieutenant of the Duke of Cornwall's Light Infantry and a Sub-Lieutenant of the Royal New Zealand Navy. Others buried here include Baroness Charles von Hügel, and two of her children, Friedrich and Pauline.

== Superiors ==
- John Bede Polding (later Archbishop of Sydney) (1805–19)
- Prior/Abbot Edmund Ford (1894–1906)
- Abbot Cuthbert Butler (1906–22)
- Abbot Leander Ramsay (1922–29)
- Abbot John Chapman (1929–33)
- Abbot Bruno Hicks (1933–38)
- Abbot Sigebert Trafford (1938–46)
- Abbot (later Bishop) Christopher Butler (1946–66)
- Abbot Wilfrid Passmore (1966–74)
- Abbot John Roberts (1974–90)
- Abbot Charles Fitzgerald-Lombard (1990–98)
- Abbot Richard Yeo (1998–2006)
- Abbot Aidan Bellenger (2006–14)
- Prior Administrator Leo Maidlow Davis (2014–18)
- Prior/Abbot Nicholas Wetz (Prior Administrator 2018–20, Abbot 2020–)

== Notable monks ==
- Dom Christopher Butler OSB, abbot, bishop, scripture scholar, author, theologian, council father
- Dom Richard Connolly (1873–1948), Syriac scholar
- Cardinal Dom Francis Aidan Gasquet OSB, Vatican librarian, historian
- Dom David Knowles OSB, Regius Professor at Cambridge, historian of monasticism
- Dom Gregory Murray OSB (1905–1992), composer, liturgist, organist
- Dom Bernard Orchard OSB
- Dom Illtyd Trethowan OSB, sub-prior 1958–1991, theologian
- Dom William Bernard Ullathorne OSB, bishop and theologian
- Dom Roger Vaughan OSB, the second Roman Catholic Archbishop of Sydney, Australia
- Dom Hubert van Zeller, author, sculptor, and cartoonist

== Daughter houses ==
Downside monks founded daughter houses at Ealing, west London (founded 1897, independent 1947, became Ealing Abbey in 1955); and at Worth, West Sussex (founded 1933, independent 1957, became Worth Abbey in 1965).

== Downside School ==
Downside School, which until 2019 was attached to the monastery, is a Roman Catholic public school for boys and girls from the age of 11 to 18. As in most Roman Catholic schools in the twenty-first century, non-Catholic pupils are accepted.

During the nineteenth century, Downside remained a small monastic school. Dom Leander Ramsay was the founder of modern Downside; he planned the new buildings that opened in 1912 and now form two sides of the Quad.

The school has a board of governors with eleven members, one of whom is from the Abbey community.

Since September 2019, the school and the abbey are run by separate trusts as part of reforms overseen by the Charity Commission in the wake of an investigation into child abuse of pupils by monks.

== Child abuse ==
In January 2012, Father Richard White, a Downside Abbey monk who formerly taught at its school, was jailed for five years for gross indecency and indecent assault against a pupil in the late 1980s. White, 66, who was known to pupils as Father Nick, had been allowed to continue teaching after he was first caught abusing a child in 1987 and was able to go on to groom and assault another pupil in the junior school. He was placed on a restricted ministry and did not have any contact with the school after the second incident but was not arrested until 2010.

Two other monks with connections to Downside, also former teachers, received police cautions during an 18-month criminal investigation. One of the cautioned monks has been named as Brother Anselm (Michael Hurt), brother of actor John Hurt, who decided to transfer his monastic stability to Glenstal Abbey in Ireland in the 1980s.

Department for Education officials were said to be taking an urgent interest in child protection arrangements at the school. Inspection reports referred specifically to seven monks who had worked at the school at different times and whose behaviour had been "a cause for concern". The Independent Schools Inspectorate had previously criticised a lack of urgency in making improvements to child protection. The Charity Commission also sent a compliance team to work with the school on this, which it treated as "a high-risk case". The Abbot responded by apologising to parents and reported that 50 years of confidential school records indicated that four of the monks had faced police action, two had restrictions imposed on them, and one was cleared and returned to monastic life. A review of school governance was already taking place.

The Independent Schools Inspectorate's most recent report, 2013, states: "The arrangements for welfare, health and safety are excellent. The school's safeguarding arrangements are much improved since the November 2010 inspection and, as in the advisory visit in November 2011, policies and practice meet the requirements in full. Thorough procedures ensure the safe recruitment of staff, and all the necessary checks are carried out...The quality of the pupils' spiritual, moral, social and cultural education is excellent. This fulfils the school's aim of developing high personal standards in each pupil in the light of the school's Christian context. By the time they leave, their personal development is excellent...The quality of the school's arrangements for pastoral care is excellent."

In November 2017, the national Independent Inquiry into Child Sexual Abuse (IICSA) started to examine evidence of children being targeted for abuse at Downside School, along with another major Catholic school located at Ampleforth Abbey, as part of its investigation into the prevalence of paedophilia in the English Benedictine Congregation and its failures to properly protect young people over many decades. IICSA heard that children at the two schools could still be "at risk". The enquiry heard evidence that in 2012, the then headmaster, Father Leo Maidlow Davis, who is now the senior monk at Downside Abbey, made trips with a loaded wheelbarrow to a distant part of its grounds, where he made a bonfire, destroying staff files dating back to the early 1980s that might have contained evidence of child abuse at the school.

Father Charles Fitzgerald-Lombard, abbot of Downside from 1990 to 1998, was among three Downside abbots accused by Father Aidan Bellenger, in a private letter, of tolerating child abuse. Father Aidan, abbot from 2006 to 2014, said his predecessors "protected and encouraged" paedophile monks. Wrongdoers at the school were quietly moved between Benedictine monasteries and parishes when they fell under suspicion. Reference was made to instructions from Rome to destroy documents that were damaging to priests. Father Leo insisted that his decision to make a bonfire of Downside's staff files was prompted by a desire to "get rid of unnecessary old material". He accepted that the files should, under safeguarding requirements, have been kept for 70 years, conceding that he may have unintentionally destroyed information about child abuse.

=== Repercussions ===
In May 2020, it was reported that in the time following the 2018 release of the IICSA report, the school experienced major financial difficulties due to legal costs, settlement payments and falling rolls, and was obliged to sell some of its Renaissance-era paintings.

== In media ==
In 1997, the monks and choirboys released an album of choral music through Virgin Records. This was covered in the BBC Everyman episode "Virgin and the Abbey".

The Abbey and the daily activities of two monks were the subject of the first episode of the television series Retreat: Meditations from a Monastery, first shown on BBC Four in October 2017.

== Bibliography ==
- Dom Aidan Bellenger (2011). Downside Abbey: An Architectural History. Merrell. ISBN 978-1-85894-542-2.
