= Tyburn Nuns =

Catholic community of nuns

Adorers of the Sacred Heart of Jesus of Montmartre
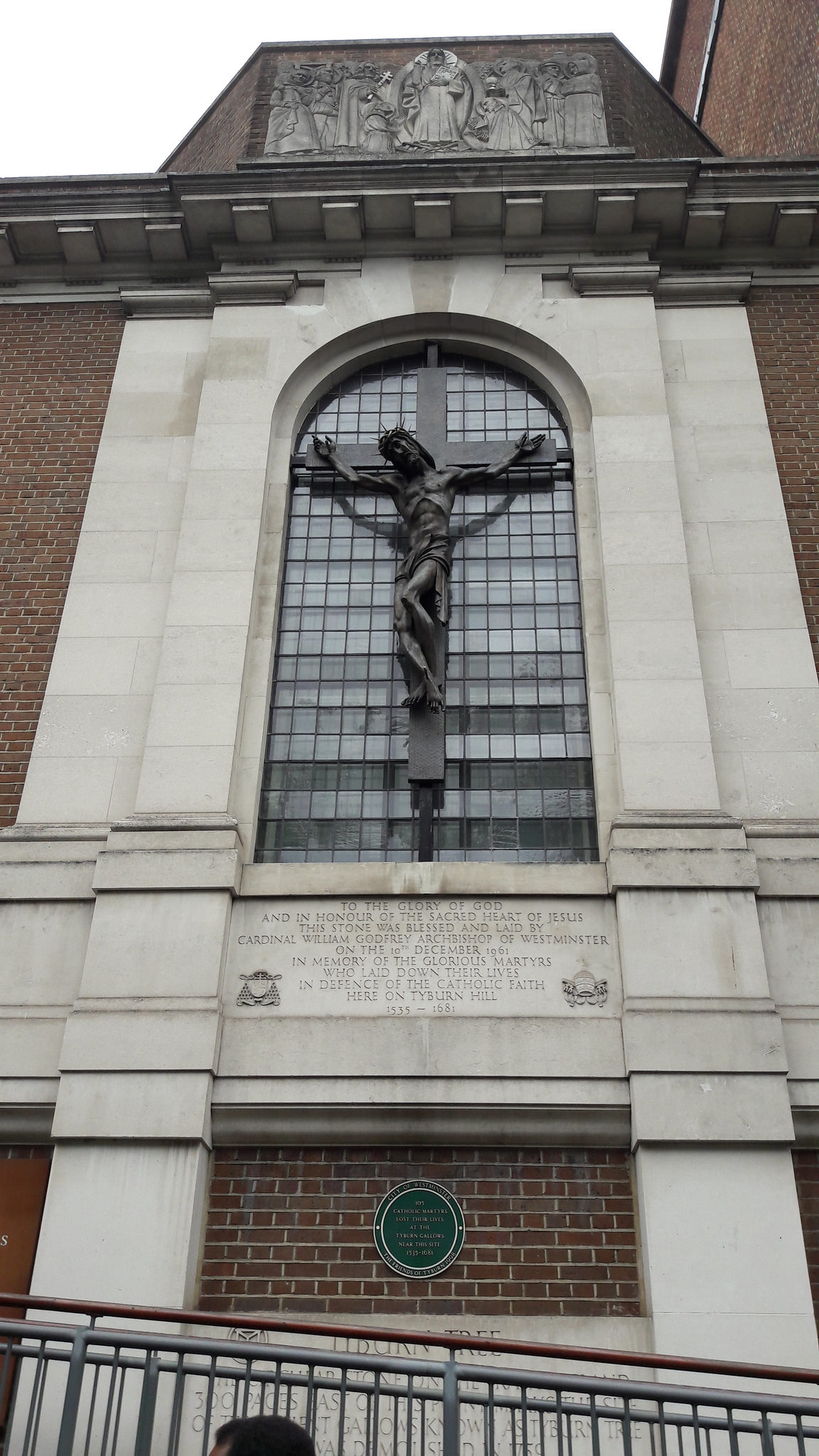
- Tyburn Convent Chapel exterior
- Formation: c. AD 1898; 128 years ago
- Founder: Mère Marie de Saint-Pierre, Adèle Garnier
- Type: Catholic religious order
- Headquarters: Marble Arch London
- Main organ: Tyburn Convent
- Website: Official website

The Tyburn Nuns, formally, Adorers of the Sacred Heart of Jesus of Montmartre, is a Catholic congregation of Benedictine nuns. The congregation was originally founded in Paris but was obliged to find a new Mother House due to French legislation passed in 1901. Two years later it relocated to London and subsequently established additional convents in nine other countries. The nuns at the London convent practice the Perpetual Adoration of the Blessed Sacrament and maintain a shrine dedicated to the Catholic martyrs of the English Reformation.

== History ==
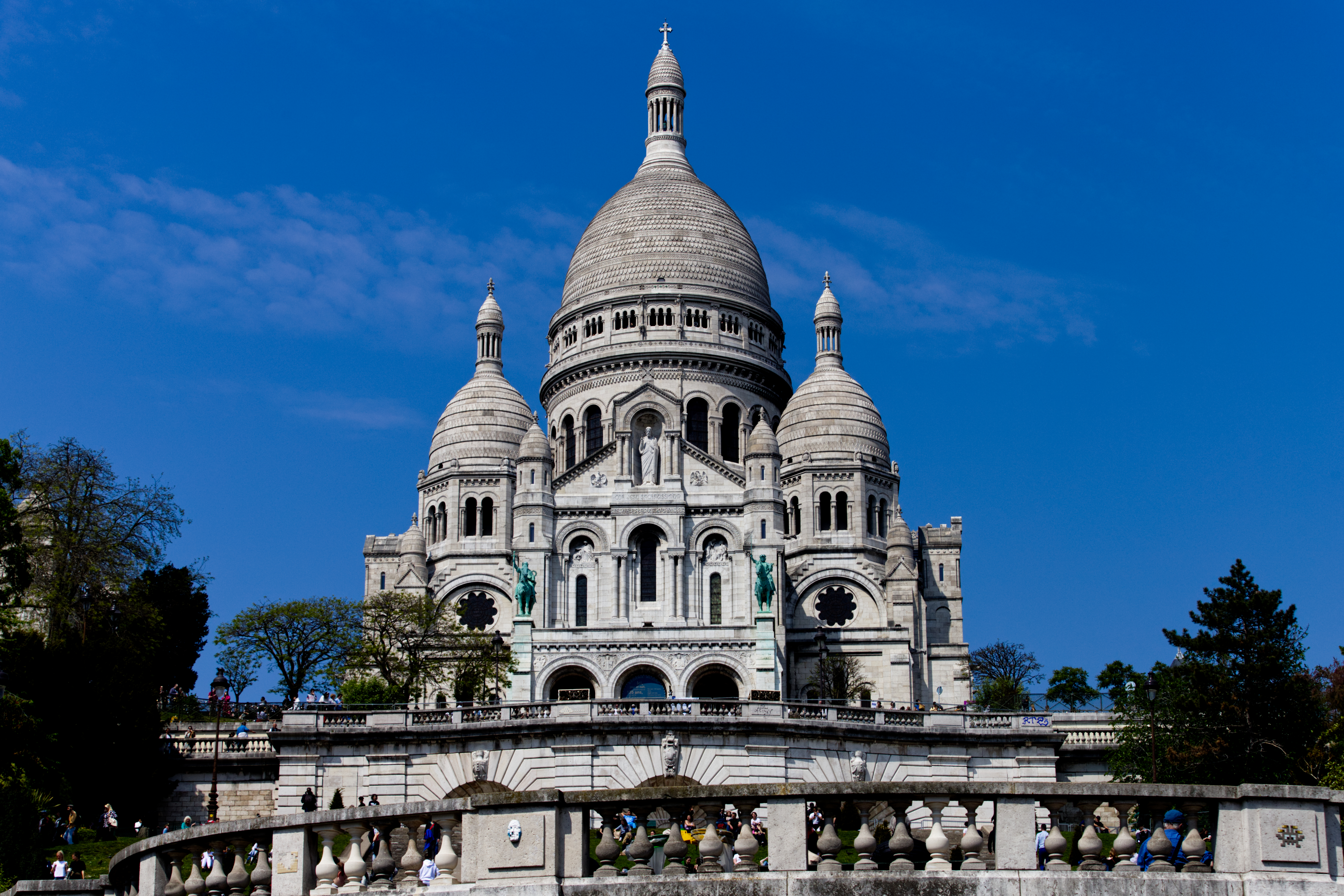
The Montmartre Basilica of the Sacré-Cœur, Paris

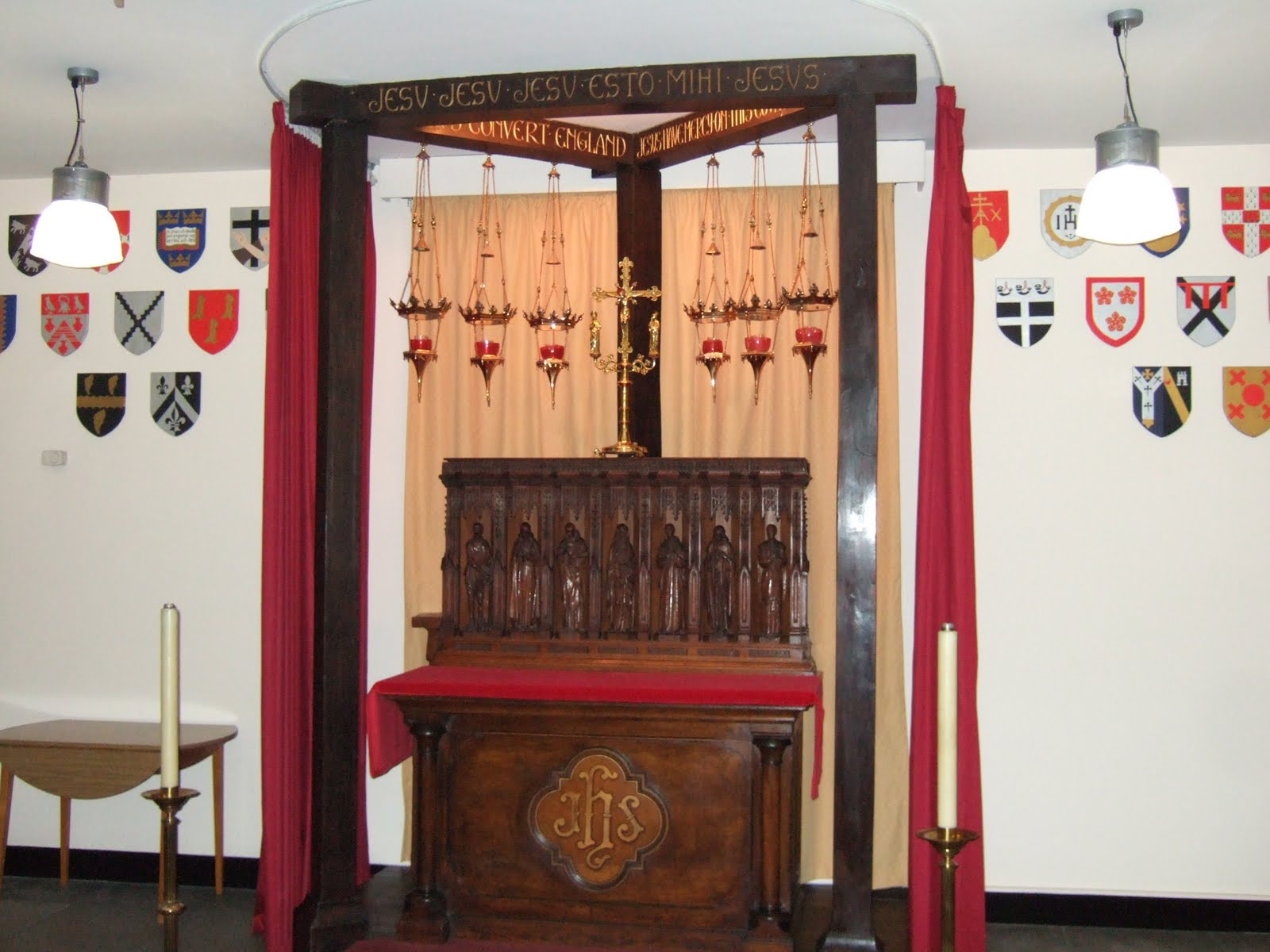
The Tyburn Martyrs' Shrine, altar with a replica of the Tyburn Tree

A Frenchwoman, Adèle Garnier, in religion, Mother Marie de Saint-Pierre, established the community in Montmartre (Mount of the Martyr), Paris in 1898. In 1901 the French legislature passed the Waldeck-Rousseau Law of Associations which placed severe restrictions on religious bodies such as monasteries and convents and caused many of them to leave France. Mother Garnier relocated the congregation to London in 1903, to what became the Tyburn Convent in Bayswater Road, near Marble Arch. The reason was because it was close to the site of the Tyburn tree, where 105 Catholic martyrs, including Saint Oliver Plunkett and Saint Edmund Campion, were executed during the English Reformation from 1535 to 1681. The newly arrived nuns established the Martyrs' Shrine to honour the more than 350 Catholic Martyrs who were executed in England during and after the Reformation. After World War II, when France had relaxed its laws regarding the independent sector, a number of native French sisters elected to return and set up in France once more. There was a split.

The Tyburn Convent is now the Mother House of the London-based congregation.

=== Devotion ===
Mother Garnier founded the Adorers to carry out Adoration of the Sacred Heart of Jesus in the exposed Blessed Sacrament, originally in the Basilica of the Sacred Heart in Montmartre. When the community moved to a religious enclosure, the Adoration shifted to the conventual setting, with numbers gradually increasing to allow for Perpetual Adoration of the Blessed Sacrament by the community.

The aim of the Adoration is to ask God for the atonement for offences against the Sacred Heart of Jesus and the Blessed Sacrament. Mystical experiences in the original congregation in France indicated that Adoration was needed to atone for sacrilege and blasphemy committed by priests and lay people against the Blessed Sacrament. At that time the Foundress also discerned a particular charism of prayer for priests.

Perpetual Adoration of the Blessed Sacrament has continued ever since the convent was established in London, except temporarily during wartime when the convent building was bombed and Adoration was relocated to Wadhurst in Sussex. Pilgrims and tourists from all over the world visit the shrine.

== Rule of life ==
The Congregation follows the Rule of St Benedict as its guide for life. This is supplemented by norms, an additional manual and book of customs specific to the congregation.

The sisters wear the traditional black Benedictine habit, but with a modernised veil and guimpe. Postulants wear lay dress and a short black veil. Novices wear the habit with a white veil and white choir cloak. Junior professed sisters wear the black veil and congregation medal and white choir cloak. Perpetually professed sisters wear the black veil, medal, ring, and white choir cowl.

The Mass and the Liturgy of the Hours are recited in the vernacular (English, Spanish).

== Expansion ==
The Tyburn community has opened other convents in:

- Scotland
- Ireland at Cobh
- New Zealand - two foundations, Tyburn Convent at Bombay
  - Auckland
  - Tyburn Convent Cor Iesu Fons Vitae at Ngakaru, Rotorua in the Hamilton Diocese
- Australia at Riverstone (but the convent has relocated closer to the Blue Mountains).
- Peru
- Ecuador
- Colombia
- Saint-Loup-sur-Aujon, France, near the birthplace of the foundress, Marie-Adèle Garnier

The Rome convent has been temporarily closed,.

Although the Congregation was founded to carry out Perpetual Adoration, today each convent only carries out Adoration mostly during the day, and shares it with the laity. A new foundation in Africa opened, but had to be closed again soon afterwards. The Congregation has also offered assistance to ageing Benedictine communities in Europe.

The Congregation numbers around 60 professed sisters worldwide in total, plus some sisters in formation.

== Post-WWII return to France ==
Following the split in the congregation confirmed and announced by the Holy See in 1947, between the Montmartre Benedictines in England and those who had returned to France, the French Bénédictines du Sacré-Cœur de Montmartre branch numbered 107 sisters as of the end of 2005, all of them in ten foundations within France.
