= Erdington Abbey =

Coordinates: 52°31′42.21″N 1°50′10.04″W

- Church of St Thomas and St Edmund
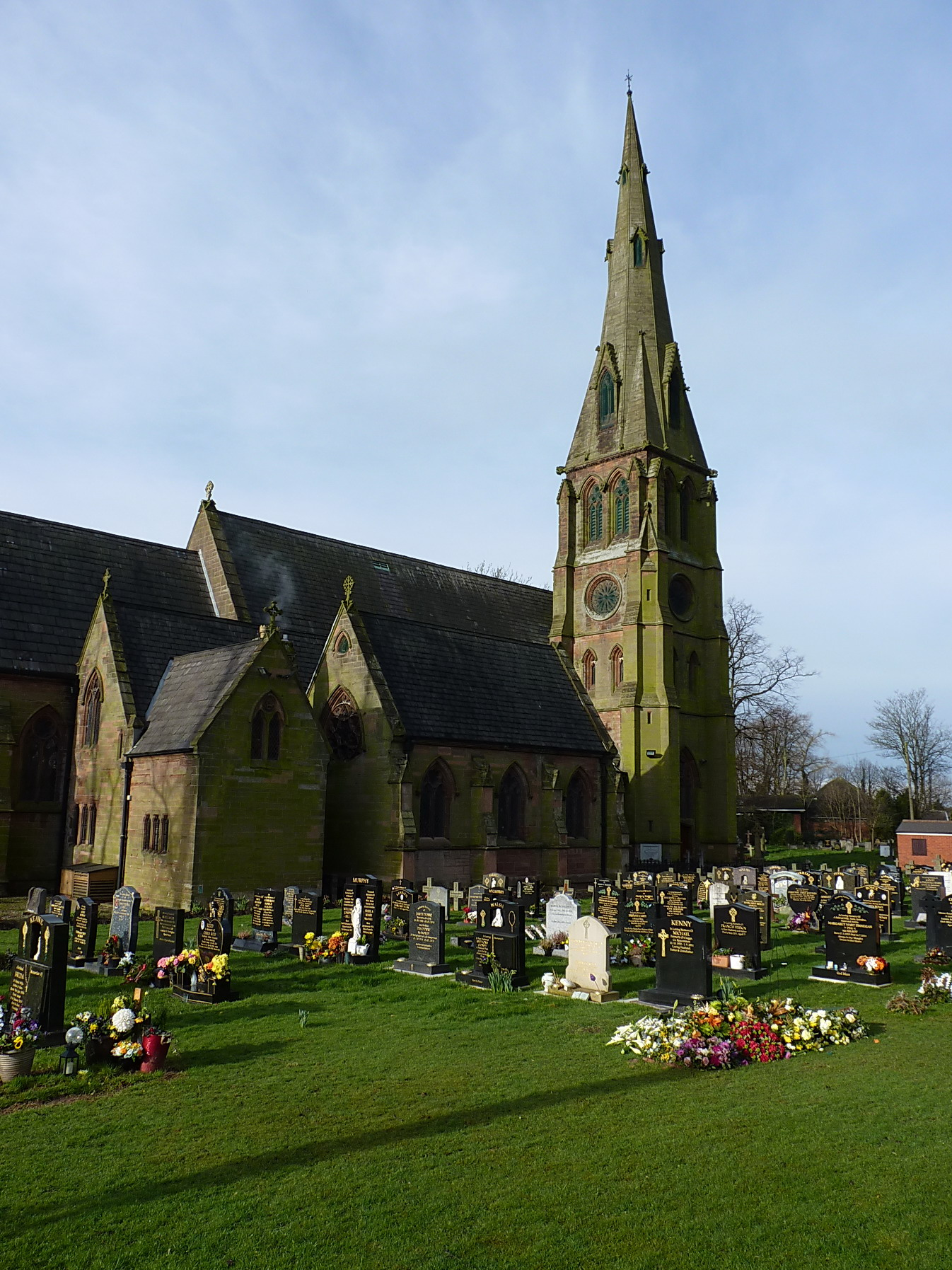
- Erdington Abbey
- Erdington Abbey
- Location: Birmingham
- Country: England
- Denomination: Roman Catholic

History
- Dedication: Thomas of Canterbury and Edmund of Canterbury

Architecture
- Heritage designation: Grade II listed
- Architect: Charles Hansom
- Groundbreaking: 1848
- Completed: 1850

Administration
- Archdiocese: Birmingham

Erdington Abbey Church (grid reference SP112922) on Sutton Road, Erdington, Birmingham, England, is the more usual name of the grade II listed church of Saints Thomas and Edmund of Canterbury. It is the church of a Roman Catholic parish in the Archdiocese of Birmingham served by the Redemptorists. The abbey itself was the adjacent building, now Highclare School.

== Erdington Abbey church ==
In 1847 Father Heneage built a chapel in Erdington High Street, on the croft opposite the end of Station Lane.

Before this priests from Oscott College had said mass in a house on the High Street, but Catholics in Erdington are mainly indebted to the Rev. Daniel H. Haigh, founder of the Church of SS Thomas & Edmund of Canterbury. He laid the foundation stone of the new church on 26 May 1848. The church was opened and consecrated by Bishop Ullathorne on 11 June 1850. The church is an example of the Gothic Revival.

The church was designed by Charles Hansom, who built the steeple of the church 117 ft (36 m) high, which is also the length of the building. The plate was designed by Augustus Pugin and made by Hardman. The abbey building is grade II listed.

== St. Thomas Abbey ==
In 1876 Daniel Haigh handed over his church, parish and estate of 4 acres (16,000 m^{2}) to Benedictine monks from Beuron in Germany, exiled from their own country during the Kulturkampf, the anti-Catholic headed by Bismarck. Founded that same year, the abbey was put under the patronage of St. Thomas (Becket) of Canterbury. The Oxford convert and historian Bede Camm joined the abbey in 1895. In 1899, Ansgar Höckelmann was elected abbot.

The Benedictine monks were displaced a second time, after World War I, since many of them were from the predominantly German Beuronese Congregation. The community suffered aggravation during the war; after it ended, they were forced to leave in 1919. Most of the monks went to Gerleve Abbey in Westphalia for two years, then on to Weingarten in 1922. That year, they sold the abbey to Redemptorist priests.

== Under the care of Redemptorist priests ==
The parish has been cared for by Redemptorist priests since 1922. The current (2026) rector is Kieran Brady.

== Cemetery ==
The attached cemetery contains war graves of three soldiers of World War I and two soldiers and four Royal Air Force personnel of World War II.
