= List of Old Gregorians =

An Old Gregorian (usually abbreviated OG) is a former member of Downside School, situated near Bath, Somerset, in the United Kingdom.

Alumni are so-named of St Gregory the Great who is the patron saint of the Downside monastic community, that used to run and own the school.

== Old Gregorians ==
=== A ===
- Sir Rudolph Agnew – former chairman of Consolidated Goldfields
- Michael J. Alexander – academic and poet
- Sir Mark Allen – United Kingdom spy, turned businessman and academic lecturer
- Rupert Allason – author (under the pen-name Nigel West) and former Conservative MP
- Antony Nicholas Allott – English academic, Professor of African Law at the University of London
- Alistair Asprey – Secretary for Security for Hong Kong Government, Commanding Officer of Royal Hong Kong Auxiliary Air Force

=== B ===
- Alex Barrow- cricketer
- Tom Bethell – editor of the American Spectator
- Robin Bennett - author and entrepreneur
- Fergus Blackie - Justice of The Supreme Court of Zimbabwe and Rhodesian Front MP
- Don Brennan – English cricketer
- Andrew Bonaparte-Wyse - Irish civil servant
- Sir Rowland Blennerhasset, 4th Baronet - Liberal Party politician
- Edward Cuthbert Butler - historian
- Norman Butler - polo player and thoroughbred owner

=== C ===
- Mark Canning- British diplomat and Former British Ambassador to Indonesia
- William Cash – author and journalist
- Denis Caulfield Heron - Irish lawyer and politician
- Jeremy Campbell-Lamerton - Scottish Rugby Union player
- Max Emanuel Cenčić - countertenor
- Alex Chisholm – Cabinet Office Permanent Secretary and Chief Operating Officer of the Civil Service
- Desmond Chute – poet and artist
- John Clibborn – British Intelligence Officer, served as MI6 head of station in Washington D.C
- Ralph Clutton – cricketer
- George Cooper – British Army officer, served as Adjutant-General to the Forces
- Brian Cotter – former Liberal Democrat MP
- Archie Cotterell – cricketer and novelist
- Archbishop Maurice Noël Léon Couve de Murville – former Archbishop of Birmingham
- Thomas Clifford, 14th Baron Clifford of Chudleigh
- William Craven, 6th Earl of Craven
- Oliver Crosthwaite-Eyre – British Conservative Party Politician

=== D ===
- John Charles Day – amongst the first Catholic judges in England to be appointed after the English Reformation
- Pete de Freitas – musician, member of Echo & The Bunnymen
- Christian Louis de Massay – Monegasque royalty
- Arthur Denaro – County Donegal-raised Commanding Officer of the Queen's Royal Irish Hussars and later Commandant of Sandhurst
- Henry Eric Dolan – World War I flying ace
- John Drummond, 17th Earl of Perth – Minister for Colonial Affairs
- Neil Dexter – former captain of Middlesex County Cricket Club

=== E ===
- Dominick Elwes – portrait painter
- Barry England – novelist and playwright
- Sir Osmond Esmonde, 12th Baronet - Teachta Dála for Fine Gael
- Peter Evans-Freke, 11th Baron Carbery - Anglo Irish Peer
- Michael Evans-Freke, 12th Baron Carbery - Anglo Irish Peer

=== F ===
- Rocco Forte – British hotelier and entrepreneur
- Edward Fitzgerald KC
- James Percy FitzPatrick – South African author, mining financier and pioneer of the fruit industry. Responsible for the two-minute silence observed on Armistice Day
- Nicolás Franco – nephew of Francisco Franco
- William Anthony Furness, 2nd Viscount Furness (1929–1995)
- Gerard Fairlie – writer, scriptwriter and Winter Olympian

=== G ===
- Joseph Gaggero – Gibraltarian businessman
- Francis Aidan Gasquet – Cardinal, Vatican librarian
- Jan Gawroński - Polish diplomat
- Carlos Gereda y de Borbón – Spanish aristocrat, engineering entrepreneur and philanthropist
- J. G. Greig – first-class cricketer, soldier, and Catholic priest
- Brion Gysin – author and artist

=== H ===
- Denis Hanley – electrical engineer and Conservative Party politician
- Jared Harris – actor
- Damian Harris – film director and screenwriter
- Jamie Harris – actor
- Simon Halliday – former England rugby player
- David Hawkins – Royal Air Force officer
- Steve Henderson – cricketer
- Bobby Henrey – child actor, star of 'The Fallen Idol'
- Denis Caulfield Heron - first Catholic Scholar at Trinity College Dublin and MP for County Tipperary
- Tristram Hillier – surrealist painter
- Patrick Holcroft – Lord-Lieutenant of Worcestershire
- Richard Holmes – biographer
- Henry Howard – first formal British envoy to the Vatican for over 300 years
- Hubert Howard – intelligence officer
- Lord Hunt of Tanworth

=== I ===
- Andrew Ibrahim - terrorist

=== J ===
- Christopher Jamison – Abbot of Worth
- Philip Jebb – architect and Liberal Party politician

=== K ===
- Chris Kelly – TV presenter and producer
- Norbert Keenan - Irish barrister and Member of the Western Australian Legislative Assembly
- Ivone Kirkpatrick - Irish born Permanent Under-Secretary of State for Foreign Affairs, British High Commissioner at Allied High Commission and Ambassador of the United Kingdom to the Holy See
- David Knowles - Regius Professor of Modern History at the University of Cambridge
- Halik Kochanski - historian and writer
- William Keatinge - military chaplain and bishop

=== L ===
- Sir John Leslie, 4th Baronet - Anglo-Irish baronet, soldier, and television presenter
- Dominic Lieven - professor at Cambridge University and Fellow of the British Academy
- John Lytton, 5th Earl of Lytton - British chartered surveyor, peer, and Member of the House of Lords

=== M ===
- Seán MacBride - Teachta Dála, Minister for Foreign Affairs, Chief of Staff of the IRA and Nobel Peace Prize Winner
- Frank MacDermot - Teachta Dála and founder of Fine Gael
- Guy Malet - artist
- Alex Mapelli-Mozzi – alpine skier
- Patrick Marnham – writer, journalist and biographer
- Pierce McCan- Teachta Dála and Easter Rising Veteran
- Pierre Maréchal- racing driver who died during 24 Hours of Le Mans
- Patrick Mason- Director of the Abbey Theatre
- Alexander McDonnell, 9th Earl of Antrim
- Nicholas Mander – baronet, historian and businessman
- Gerald Maxwell MC – First World War flying ace
- Prince Emmanuel de Merode – Director of the Virunga National Park in the Democratic Republic of the Congo
- Midland - DJ and Producer
- James Miller – journalist and film-maker
- David Mlinaric – interior designer
- Joseph Molony - Chairman of the General Council of the Bar
- Richard More O'Ferrall - Governor of Malta and high level politician, of the prominent More O'Ferrall family.
- Peter Morgan – Oscar nominated scriptwriter
- John Mullan – professor of English and writer
- Helenus Milmo – Irish lawyer and High Court Judge

=== N ===
- Albert Nelson, 6th Earl Nelson
- Henry Nelson, 7th Earl Nelson
- Martin Newland – former editor of The Daily Telegraph
- Barry Nicholas – classicist, former Principal of Brasenose College, Oxford
- William Nicholson – playwright and Oscar winner
- Marek Niedużak - lawyer
- Patrick Nixon – diplomat
- Michael Noakes – artist
- John Norman – first-class cricketer
- Stafford Northcote, 4th Earl of Iddesleigh

=== O ===
- Sir Tim O'Brien, 3rd Baronet- England Cricket Team player
- John O'Brien- Ireland Cricket Team player
- Daniel O'Connell - leader of the movement for Catholic emancipation, Irish Nationalist and MP
- Charles Owen O'Conor, O'Conor Don - Liberal MP for Roscommon and President of Gaelic League
- Denis Charles Joseph O'Conor - hereditary Chief of the Name O'Conor
- Denis Maurice O'Conor - Liberal MP for Sligo County
- Denis Armar O'Conor, O'Conor Don - Irish nobleman
- Denis Maurice O'Conor - former Lord Justice of Appeal
- Mervyn O'Gorman- British electrical and aircraft engineer
- Denis Ormerod- first Roman Catholic commander of the Ulster Defence Regiment

=== P ===
- Anthony Palliser – artist
- Tony Pearson – cricketer
- Nigel Poett – British Army Officer, commanded the 5th Parachute Brigade during the second world war
- John Bede Polding – first Archbishop of Sydney
- Francis Pollen – architect, worked on buildings at the Abbey and school
- Philip Pope – actor and composer
- James Pope-Hennessy – biographer and travel writer
- John Pope-Hennessy – former director of the British Museum
- Nicholas Preston, 17th Viscount Gormanston – art connoisseur and aristocrat
- Jonathan Pugh – cartoonist
- Edmund Purdom – film actor

=== R ===
- Timothy Radcliffe – Master of the Order of Preachers (Dominicans) from 1992 to 2001
- Peter Rawlinson, Baron Rawlinson of Ewell – Solicitor General and Attorney General
- George William Rendel – diplomat
- Dan Riddiford – New Zealand politician of the National Party
- Michael Richey – navigator and author
- Paul Richey – flying ace of the Second World War and author
- Michael Robinson – flying ace of the Second World War
- Jerome Roche – musicologist
- Tremayne Rodd, 3rd Baron Rennell – Conservative peer - Scottish rugby international
- Nicholas Rossiter – TV producer

=== S ===
- John de Salis, 9th Count de Salis-Soglio – ICRC delegate and envoy
- Hilary St George Saunders – author
- Wilfrid Sheed – novelist and essayist
- Todd Sharpville – musician
- Arthur Sidgreaves – businessman, head of Rolls-Royce during the Second World War
- Eugene Simon – actor
- Sir John Smythe, 8th Baronet – cricketer
- Sir Robert Stapylton – courtier, dramatic poet and translator
- Richard Stokes – former Lord Privy Seal
- Christopher Sykes – author
- John Sweetman - founder of Sinn Féin
- Roger Sweetman - Teachta Dála for Sinn Féin and abstentionist MP

=== T ===
- Artur Tarnowski - politician
- Edd Thrower – former professional rugby player
- Simon Tolkien – author and novelist
- Rudolph de Trafford – aristocrat and banker
- Maurice Turnbull – Welsh rugby international and Test cricketer
- Bernard Turnbull – former captain of Wales Rugby Team
- Paolo Tullio – writer, radio/TV personality and Michelin star-winning chef

=== U ===
- James Underwood – pathologist
- William Bernard Ullathorne – English prelate

=== V ===
- John Varley – former CEO of Barclays
- Hugh Vyvyan – captain of Saracens Rugby

=== W ===
- Auberon Waugh – journalist
- Robert Walker, Baron Walker of Gestingthorpe – former Justice of the Supreme Court of the United Kingdom
- Patrick Wall – Royal Marines officer and Conservative politician
- Charles Walmesley – Procurator General, astronomer and mathematician
- Dennis Walters – Conservative Party politician
- Charles Wegg-Prosser – politician and solicitor
- Bob Wellings – broadcaster
- Sir Christopher White - art historian and museum director
- Arthur B. Woods – film director
- Douglas Woodruff – editor of the Tablet

=== Z ===
- Adam Zamoyski – historian

== Bibliography ==
- List of Boys at St Gregory's, Downside Abbey, Bath, 1972: covers 1614–1972.
- List of Boys at St Gregory's: First Supplement, Downside Abbey, Bath, 1983: covers 1967–1982 and lists corrections to the 1972 publication.
