= Prouton =

Prouton may refer to:

- Proton (prouton was an early candidate for the name of the particle)
- Ralph Prouton, cricketer
