= Downside ball game =

The Downside ball game (The bat & ball game)
- Downside School pupils playing the Downside ball game at The Ball Place, 2013
- Nicknames: Ball game
- First played: 1820 at Downside School, Stratton-On-The Fosse
- Clubs: Downside

Characteristics
- Team members: Doubles
- Mixed-sex: Yes (girls from 2005)
- Type: Racket sport
- Equipment: Leather ball 1½ inches - Rugby fives ball (as substitute), downside ball game bat
- Venue: 'The Ball Place', Downside School

Presence
- Country or region: Great Britain

The Downside ball game is an outdoor racquet sport played by Gregorians at Downside School, Stratton-On-The-Fosse, Somerset since 1820. It bears some similarities to Rugby fives; however, it is played with a solid wooden bat rather than one's hand.

== History of the sport ==
The History of the sport came about from Downside's situation at the time, as there was no room for anything else, there were fewer than sixty boys in the School throughout the 1820s. Abbot Snow, an Abbot of Downside Abbey, once said how football, 'not the tactical manoeuvring of backs and forwards, but the rough-and-tumble game of kicking how and when you could' was the favourite sport, together with 'cricket of a sort' and 'handball in the spring'.

By the end of the nineteenth century it had become a part of Downside folklore that the term 'handball' was a translation of the generic `jeu de paume' and referred to a long-popular game known as 'bat and ball' that had come over with Downside from the continent, as evidenced by the very similar game being played at Ushaw College which, like Downside, had its origins at Douai in Flanders.

However, extensive research by the late Dom Lucius Graham OSB has shown that, prior to the building of the present Ball Place, the only version of the game known to Gregorians was not only called 'handball' but was indeed played with the hand. Dom Lucius surmised that the wall's size, and particularly its height, which exceeded the requirements of handball, prompted the introduction of the bat. Certainly, at the time Dom Stephen Rawlinson came as a schoolboy in 1876, both the hand and the bat varieties were in use, though the former seems to have lost favour and vanished, owing, notes a later commentator, to damage to the players' hands.

In its heyday, a boy who was good at bat-and-ball 'was as much thought of as a successful cricketer', but, by the end of the nineteenth century, it, too, was losing favour on the plea that it was 'too much fag' to make the cork, worsted and leather balls. A sample of the bat, some 27 inches long with a small broadening at the business end, famous for having been used by The Prince of Wales (later King Edward VIII) during his visit to Downside in 1932, is currently on display in the Court of Arches at Downside. The balls are never more than 1½ inches in diameter and the strokes were made with a downward sweep of the arm.

== "The Ball Place" ==
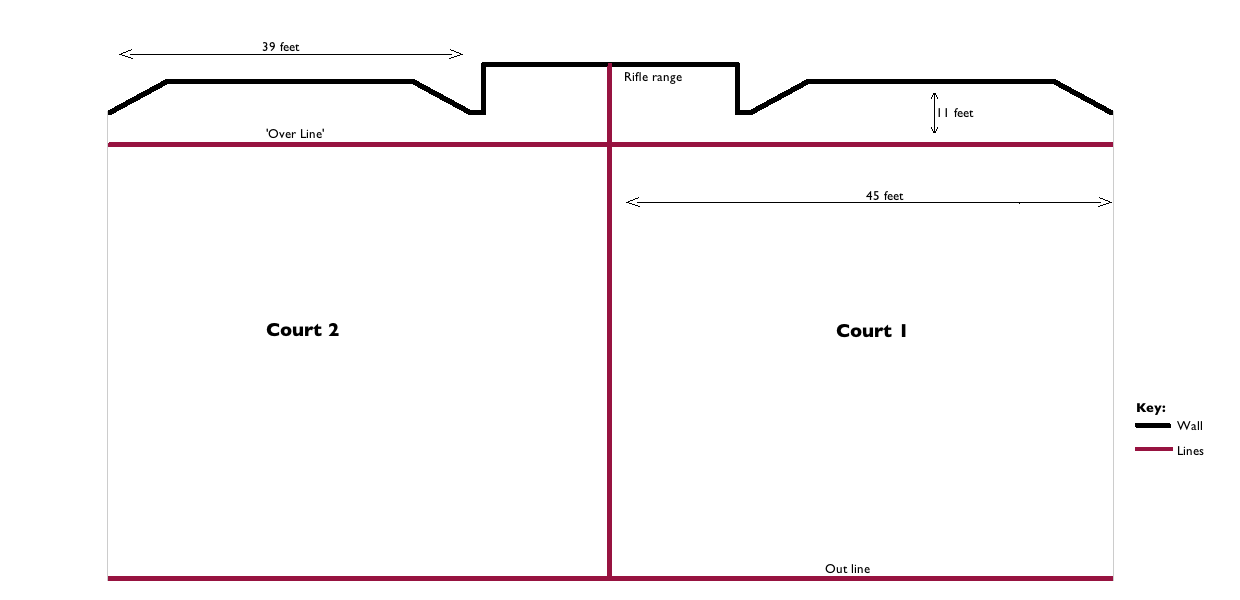
The layout of the Ball Place (at Downside School)

The Wall is a massive structure, some 12 metres high by 30 wide, comprising two playing walls, each with angled wings, and an open-fronted shelter forming a sort of distance-piece between them. It was within a few years of the opening of this grand court that Bat-and-Ball made its appearance.

The game can be traced from at least when the Gregorian community made its first purchase of property at Stratton-on-the-Fosse by a deed dated 25 March 1814, the estate consisted of the building we now know as the Old House, some farm buildings behind it and about one hundred acres of farmland. The need for self-sufficiency meant that much of this land had to remain under agriculture and it was only very gradually that successive fields were taken into use as grounds and pitches. It was inevitable in these circumstances that ball games were largely informal ad hoc pastimes during the various breaks for recreation - and there is a similar version from Douai from which this evolved.

There had in fact been no fewer than three ball places at Downside before 1854. The first, put up soon after the school's arrival in 1814, was roughly at a point just south of the present 'Parrot Cage'. This was probably demolished or moved in 1823 to make room for the Old Chapel block. The second seems to have been where the Main Hall of Downside School now stands and was apparently replaced on the same or a nearby site by a new one in 1831. This, too, was overtaken by the need for a new study room (now the Main Hall) and theatre (now, the Petre Library), which were opened in 1854. Thus it was that in that same year, by subscription (now called an appeal), the present Ball Place, or, more accurately, the pair of ball places, was erected.

As originally landscaped, the playing area fanned out eastward to form a series of pleasing, if somewhat useless, terraced steps that descended to the curious 'temporary' building now known as the Gasquet Hall. Thirty years later, a pious benefactor, known only from the (still legible) inscription on the plinth, Ora pro me datore 1884, erected a large stone statue of Our Lady at the centre of the second step. A few yards further down were two beech trees, each encircled by an outdoor seat, which lasted until the late 1940s. The whole grand design was much reduced and unbalanced in 1958, and again in 1963, by the intrusion of two modern buildings, leaving the Statue of Our Lady somewhat incongruously facing the blank gable end of the New Classrooms.

By 1996, the statue had become unsafe, weathered beyond restoration, and was taken down, leaving The Ball Place with a vacant plinth. The southern end of the wall was damaged by a falling tree in the great storm of 1990 and rebuilt with insurance money. At about the same time the whole area was re-surfaced with tarmacadam and its lower reaches grassed over. This, then, is the Ball Place, in all essentials, its wall and court have not changed since 1854, but the game lingered on with periodic outbreaks of enthusiasm for what was inevitably becoming an antiquarian curiosity until surface disrepair during the Second World War made the courts virtually unplayable. It has proved itself to be such a useful and versatile space that it could be deemed to have justified its existence even without its early use for its intended purpose. Over the years, it has served as a parade ground for the CCF (and its predecessors the OTC and the JTC); as the site of gym displays; as an all-weather hockey pitch; as a recreation ground for small cricket, cycling and, most recently, skateboarding and radio-controlled model cars. On Prize Day it serves as a car park. Its walls have inevitably been much used for tennis practice (in the 1980s it had white targets painted on it for serving practice) and its alcove or shelter has often housed Corpus Christi altars. At least once it has been the setting for a play (Macbeth) and, before the (now demolished) outdoor rifle range was built, it was frequently used for shooting and still bears the scars.

Last, but not least, it has served to fuel the curiosity of visitors. Dom Hubert van Zeller reports, in his book, Downside By and Large (1953), how boys have been heard 'with mistaken loyalty and rich imagination' explaining to visitors that the Ball Place wall is all that is left of the ancient Abbey of St Gregory's, dissolved by Henry VIII.

== Game rules and terms ==
An example of the bats and balls used in the Downside ball game

1- The game is played by four players, two on each side.

2- A game consists of 21 points.

3- Points can only be scored by the side which is serving (i.e. "in"), not by the side which is receiving the service (i.e. "out").

4- Serving :

(i) Both players on the side which is "in" serve in turn: first one serves until his side loses in a rally (always called a "dodge") and then the other; when both have been put "out", the other side comes "in". But in the cases of the side which goes "in" first and when both sides are "game-ball" (i.e. 20 points each), only one player serves, it does not matter which. When only one side is "game-ball", only one player on that side serves, but both players on the other side serve until they too reach "game-ball".

(ii) A player serves by hitting the ball full toss against the front wall or against one of the corners; in this latter case he must first call "corners play"; if he does not do so, the players, who are "out" may try at it the same way as a "not over" ball (see below section iv).

(iii) If the served ball comes beyond the line marked across the floor of the court, about 11 feet from the edge of the ball-place and does not bounce below the lower stone rib, it is "over" and must be taken by the "out" players. N.B.— On the serve the returner must take the ball first bounce, not full pitch.

(iv) If the served ball does not come "over", the "out" players may take the service or not as they please; but if the serve is taken and the ball is hit out of the court or below the stone rib which is about two and a half feet above the floor, the "in" side scores no point; but if the ball hits the wall correctly and a "dodge" follows, that side scores, which wins the "dodge".

(v) When a side is "game-ball", the players of that side may not serve off the corners; they must also call "game-ball play" before serving, otherwise they cannot win the game off that point, even if they win the "dodge".

(vi) If the server misses the ball altogether he is not "out" unless he misses three times in succession; if in serving he fails to hit the wall above the lower stone rib, or he misses the wall entirely or the ball bounces out of the court, he is "out"; if, when meaning to serve off the front wall, he hits the corner, or if, when meaning to serve off the corner and having called "corners play", he hits the front wall, the "out players" may treat it as a "not over" ball (see section iv above)

(vii) While a player is serving and until the service has been taken by an "out" player, the server’s partner must stand between the wall and the "over" line; provided that he does not move out of this area, he may prevent a serve not going out over the side lines with his bat or his hand, but not in any other way. The same applies to any service which is obviously not going "over".

5- The play :

(i) In a "dodge" the ball may be hit first bounce or full pitch.

(ii) If the "in" side wins a "dodge", one point is added to that side’s score; if the "out" side wins, the server is put out and the server’s partner serves; when both have been put out, the "out" side comes "in".

(iii) The ball must always hit the wall above the lower stone rib; if it hits the sloping top of the ball-place or the stone rib across the upper part of the wall and bounces in the court, the player on the other side taking it, may claim an "hindrance"; but if he takes it, not claiming an "hindrance", then the "dodge" continues and a score for one side or the other results.

(iv) If a player in taking a ball from a serve or in a "dodge" hits one of his opponents with the ball above the knee, it is counted "up", but is always an "hindrance"; but if it hits the opponent below the knee, it counts as a "miss", and the opponents’ side wins the "dodge". If the ball hits his partner, it is also a "miss" and the opponents‘ side wins the "dodge". Unintentional obstruction of the striker by one of the other side or by any other person or accidental occurrence from without (but not of course by the striker’s partner or as a result of his own slipping or the like) is always an "hindrance".

(v) If a serve pitches on the "over" line, it is not "over"; if in a serve or "dodge", the ball pitches on the side line dividing the two courts, it is in, if on the stone curb on the other it is out; if on the edge of the stone rib, it is in. The stone pillar may not be claimed as an "hindrance" owing to the ball bouncing near it.

"(vi)" If the ball bounces past the out line, 6 feet from the back of the Ball Place, then the team who hit the ball loses that point.

(vii) Some conventions and general remarks about the play:—A player can never win a point by "sneaking", i.e. by hitting the ball very low on the wall or very gently on purpose: he should always try to hit the ball hard and as high on the wall as possible; if he cannot hit the ball hard owing to the risk of it going out of the court because of the angle to the wall at which he is taking it, he should at any rate hit the ball high on the wall. When one side is "game-ball", the other side may "sneak" when it is "out", not when it is "in": when both sides are "game-ball", only the side which is "out" may "sneak". Corner services can never be used. However, they can be used by a side which is a long way behind the other in an effort to try and catch up; but the normal service is a straightforward high serve off the front wall. In fact the essence of the game is to have a good "dodge" and a close game. In the course of a "dodge" play off the corners is not only legitimate, but often the best thing to do, e.g., if a player is drawn well to the side of the court in order to take a ball, the best shot is to the opposite corner. A certain amount of "barracking" is traditional.

== Legacy ==
The apparent death of the game as a serious sport was surely inevitable, following the transformation of Downside, during the decade preceding the First World War, from a Continental-style college into a mainstream public school: these were the years that saw the introduction of Rugby Football, Squash, Racquets and, above all, Lawn Tennis. Against such, the older, less sophisticated game, with no prospect of external match fixtures, stood little chance of survival and all efforts to re-introduce it have, so far, failed. However, in 2013 the game was re-introduced into the school life and is fast becoming a major sport at Downside School, with inter-house matches played in the summer term. The Ball Place is still there and continues, as it has for almost 200 years, to be a significant facility in the life of the school.
