= John O'Brien (Irish cricketer) =

Irish cricketer (1866–1920)

Personal information
- Full name: John George O'Brien
- Born: 10 January 1866; Dublin, Ireland
- Died: 15 August 1920 (aged 54); Dublin, Ireland
- Batting: Right-handed
- Bowling: Right-arm slow
- Relatives: Tim O'Brien (brother)

Domestic team information
- Years: Team
- 1910: Ireland

Career statistics
Competition	First-class
Matches	1
Runs scored	7
Batting average	3.50
100s/50s	–/–
Top score	4
Catches/stumpings	1/–
- Source: Cricinfo, 21 October 2018

John George O'Brien (10 January 1866 – 15 August 1920) was an Irish first-class cricketer.

O'Brien was born at Dublin in January 1866, the son of Timothy O'Brien and Mary O'Dwyer. He was educated at the Catholic Downside School in England. He served in the British Army with the Royal Monmouthshire Royal Engineers, Royal Field Artillery, and the King's Shropshire Light Infantry, reaching the rank of captain. He made one appearance in first-class cricket for Ireland against Scotland at Dublin in 1910 at the age of 43, when he was called up to play as a late replacement for Robert St Leger Fowler. He was dismissed by John Bruce Lockhart for 4 runs in Ireland's first-innings, while in their second-innings he was dismissed by Robert Tait for 3 runs. His brother, Tim O'Brien, played Test cricket for England.
