= John Clibborn =

MI6 officer

John Clibborn in 1968

John Donovan Nelson Dalla Rosa Clibborn CMG (24 November 1941 – 16 December 2017) was a British Intelligence Officer who served as MI6 head of station in Washington D.C. He was awarded the Central Intelligence Agency's Agency Seal Medal by deputy director George Tenet in 1995 and made a Companion of the Order of St Michael and St George (CMG) by the British government in 1997.

Clibborn was educated at Downside School and Oriel College, Oxford, where he took a double-first in Classics. He joined the Secret Intelligence Service (which he described in his Who's Who entry as being HM Diplomatic Service) in 1965. His first overseas posting was to Nicosia, Cyprus (1965–1969), and he was later posted to Bonn (1972–1975); the UK Mission to the European Commission in Brussels (1975–1978); and had two separate spells in Washington (1988–1991, 1994–1995).

Clibborn was a Roman Catholic and a memorial mass was celebrated in his honour.

== Honours ==
- Companion of the Order of St Michael and St George (CMG) – 1997
