= Sir John Smythe, 8th Baronet =

English cricketer and British Army officer

Personal information
- Full name: John Walter Smythe
- Born: 7 November 1827; Acton Burnell, Shropshire, England
- Died: 5 March 1919 (aged 91); Acton Burnell, Shropshire, England
- Batting: Unknown
- Bowling: Unknown

Domestic team information
- Years: Team
- 1878–1885: Marylebone Cricket Club

Career statistics
Competition	First-class
Matches	5
Runs scored	122
Batting average	13.55
100s/50s	–/–
Top score	35
Balls bowled	76
Wickets	2
Bowling average	12.00
5 wickets in innings	–
10 wickets in match	–
Best bowling	2/24
Catches/stumpings	3/–
- Source: Cricinfo, 21 April 2021

Sir John Walter Smythe, 8th Baronet (7 November 1827 – 5 March 1919) was an English first-class cricketer and British Army officer.

== Early life ==
The son of Sir Edward Joseph Smythe, he was born in November 1827 at the Smythe family home, Acton Burnell Hall in Shropshire. His family were Roman Catholic, so he was educated at Downside School.

== Career ==
Smythe served as an officer in the Irish County of Louth Regiment of Militia, known as Louth Rifles. He was promoted to captain in July 1855. With the regiment he undertook garrison duty at the Curragh Camp in Ireland and Aldershot Garrison in England during the Crimean War.

Smythe served as a Deputy-Lieutenant and Justice of the Peace for the counties of Shropshire and Monmouthshire. He was nominated for High Sheriff of Shropshire in 1904, but was not chosen.

== Cricket ==
A latecomer to first-class cricket, Smythe made his first-class debut for the Marylebone Cricket Club (MCC) against Oxford University at the age of 50 in June 1878. He played first-class matches for the MCC until 1885, making five appearances. He scored 122 runs in his five matches, with a highest score of 35, while as a bowler he took 2 wickets.

== Other sports ==
From age eight, Smythe was a keen hunter with not only the Shropshire Fox Hounds (of which he became secretary in 1901, and later of South Shropshire Fox Hounds, when the hunt country was divided) but also the Irish Louth, Meath, Kildare and Garrison Stag Hounds, and was a widely competing steeplechase horse racer. When Polo was introduced by The Hurlingham Club he was the club's first polo manager, from 1873 to 1898, during which time he instituted the Championship Cup and Inter-Regimental tournaments.

== Family ==
Smythe married in 1864 Marie Louise, youngest daughter of William Herbert, of Clytha Park, Monmouthshire. He succeeded to the Smythe baronetcy as the 8th Baronet upon the death of his brother, Sir Charles Smythe in November 1897. They had one son and two daughters.

In 1914 his home at Acton Burnell Hall was burned down but rebuilt by him. Smythe died at Acton Burnell Hall in March 1919. He was succeeded as the 9th Baronet by his son Sir Edward Smythe. Lady Smythe died in 1929.

Peerage of the United Kingdom
Preceded by Sir Charles Smythe	Baronet (of Eshe Hall, Durham); 1897–1919	Succeeded by Sir Edward Smythe
