= Chuka Umunna =

British politician (born 1978)

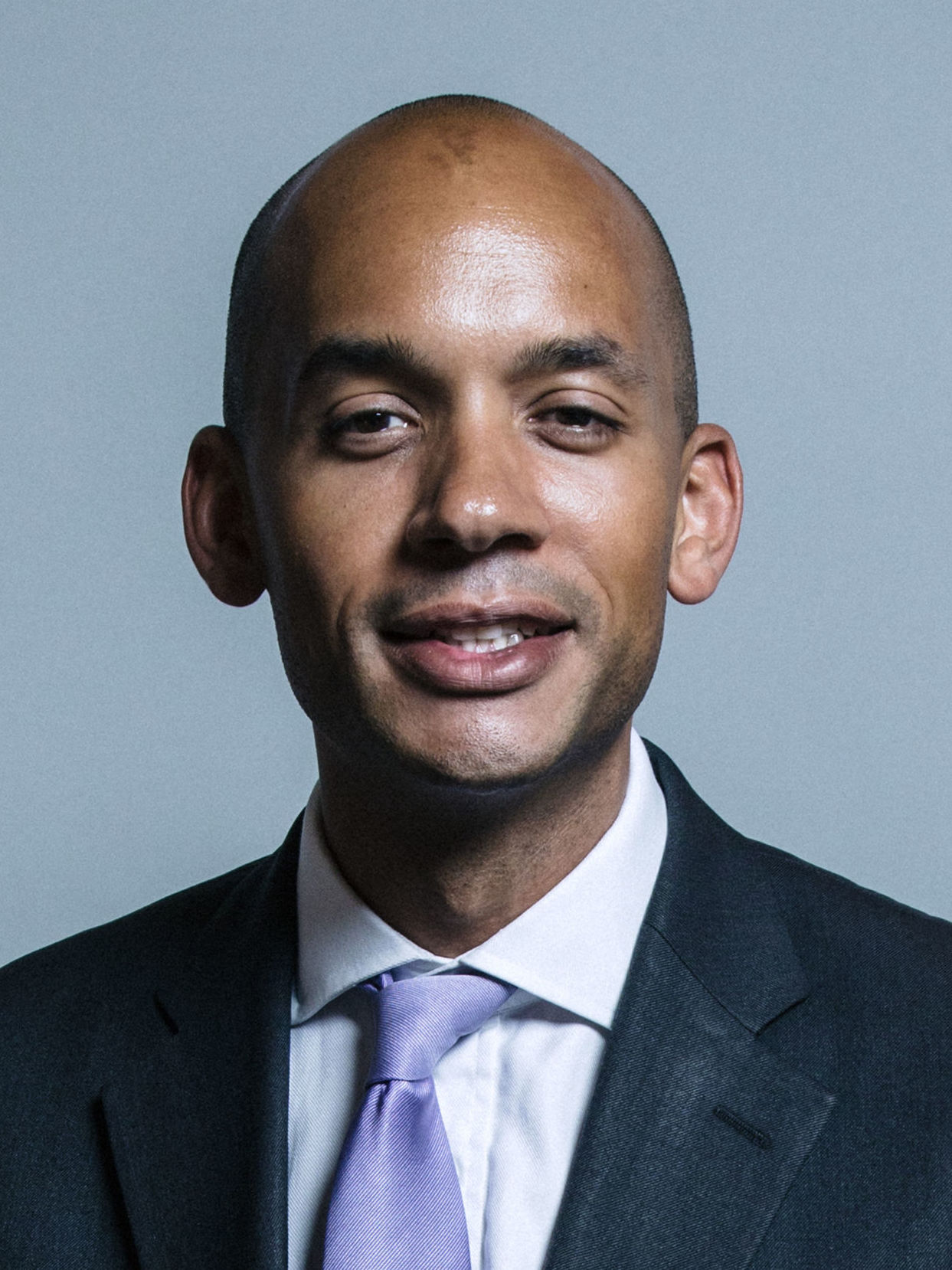
- Official portrait, 2017

Shadow Secretary of State for Business, Innovation and Skills
- In office 7 October 2011 – 13 September 2015
- Leader: Ed Miliband; Harriet Harman (acting); Jeremy Corbyn
- Preceded by: John Denham
- Succeeded by: Angela Eagle

Parliamentary Private Secretary to the Leader of the Opposition
- In office 10 October 2010 – 23 May 2011 Serving with Anne McGuire
- Leader: Ed Miliband
- Preceded by: Desmond Swayne
- Succeeded by: Michael Dugher

Member of Parliament for Streatham
- In office 6 May 2010 – 6 November 2019
- Preceded by: Keith Hill
- Succeeded by: Bell Ribeiro-Addy

Change UK portfolios
- 2019: Group Spokesperson
- 2019: Cabinet Office

Liberal Democrat portfolios
- 2019: Business and Industrial Strategy
- 2019: HM Treasury
- 2019: International Development
- 2019: International Trade
- 2019: Foreign and Commonwealth Office

Personal details
- Born: Chuka Harrison Umunna; 17 October 1978 (age 47) Lambeth, London, England
- Party: Liberal Democrats (since 2019; before 1997)
- Other political affiliations: Independent (2019); Change UK (2019); Labour (1997–2019)
- Spouse: Alice Sullivan (m. 2016)
- Relations: Sir Helenus Milmo (grandfather)
- Children: 3
- Education: University of Manchester; Nottingham Trent University
- Website: chuka.org.uk

Chuka Harrison Umunna // (/ˈtʃʊkə əˈmuːnə/; born 17 October 1978) is a British businessman and former politician who served as Member of Parliament (MP) for Streatham from 2010 until 2019. A former member of the Labour Party, he was part of the Shadow Cabinet from 2011 to 2015. He left Labour in February 2019, when he resigned to form The Independent Group, later Change UK, along with six other MPs. Later in 2019, he left Change UK and, after a short time as an independent MP, joined the Liberal Democrats. In the 2019 general election, he failed to be re-elected, and did not return to the House of Commons.

Born in Lambeth to a Nigerian father and English-Irish mother, Umunna was educated at St Dunstan's College, a private school. He then studied law at the University of Manchester and Nottingham Trent University. A teenage member of the Liberal Democrats, he joined the Labour Party in 1997 when the party was styling itself as "New Labour". He worked as a solicitor in the City of London, first for Herbert Smith and then for Rochman Landau, while writing articles for the Compass think tank.

Umunna was selected as Labour's parliamentary candidate for Streatham in 2008, and was elected MP in the 2010 general election. When in parliament, he aligned with the party's "Blue Labour" trend, which rejects neoliberal economics. He sat on the Treasury Select Committee until 2011, when he joined Ed Miliband's Shadow Cabinet as Shadow Secretary of State for Business, Innovation and Skills. He was re-elected in the 2015 and 2017 general elections. Following Miliband's resignation, Jeremy Corbyn was elected Labour leader in 2015; Umunna was critical of the party leadership and resigned from the Shadow Cabinet to sit as a backbencher.

A supporter of the unsuccessful 2016 referendum campaign to retain UK membership of the European Union, Ummuna campaigned for a referendum on the final deal with the EU. In February 2019, he resigned from Labour and joined The Independent Group, later Change UK. He was its group spokesperson but left in June 2019 to sit as an independent MP following "disappointing" European Parliament election results showing the party had "failed to get a single MEP elected". One week later, Umunna joined the Liberal Democrats and was appointed their Treasury and Business Spokesperson by leader Vince Cable. In August 2019, he was appointed Foreign Affairs, International Development and International Trade Spokesperson by new leader Jo Swinson. He stood for Cities of London and Westminster in the 2019 general election but lost to Nickie Aiken of the Conservatives.

In 2021, Umunna joined JPMorgan Chase as Managing Director of its Environmental, Social, Governance (ESG) advisory group in London. In July 2024, he was promoted to Global Head of Sustainable Solutions & EMEA Head of Green Economy Investment Banking, where he will co-lead the firm's global ESG practice.

== Early life and career ==
Umunna was born in Lambeth, south London, on 17 October 1978 and had a "typically middle-class, privileged upbringing". His father, Bennett, of the Nigerian Igbo ethnic group and owner of an import-export business, died in a road accident in Nigeria in 1992. He had come from an impoverished background in Ogbunka, arriving in Liverpool in the 1960s; he studied business administration at night school whilst taking jobs such as cleaning cars, eventually establishing his own company. Umunna's mother, Patricia Milmo, a solicitor, is of English-Irish background, daughter of High Court judge Sir Helenus Milmo QC.

Umunna was educated at Hitherfield Primary School in Streatham, south London, and the Christ Church Primary School in Brixton Hill. He says his parents felt that the local state school had "given up on him" and as a result had moved him to the boys' independent senior school St Dunstan's College, in south-east London, where he played the cello. During this period he was also a chorister at Southwark Cathedral. As a teenager, he was a member of the Liberal Democrats. He was awarded an upper second-class Bachelor of Laws degree in English and French Law from the University of Manchester. After graduating, he studied for one term at the University of Burgundy in Dijon, before studying for a Master of Arts degree at Nottingham Trent University's law school.

Following university, in 2002, Umunna began work as a solicitor for the City of London firm Herbert Smith. In 2006, he joined Rochman Landau (now Ashfords LLP), specialising in employment law and advising companies on contentious, transactional and advisory matters. From 2006, he began to write and provide commentary on the Labour Party, as well as broader social and economic issues, usually in his capacity as a member of the Management Committee of the Labour-aligned Compass think tank. He also wrote articles for the Financial Times, Tribune, The Voice, The Guardian, and the New Statesman, and began to appear on radio and television programmes as a commentator. He founded and edited the online political magazine, The Multicultural Politic. In 2007, he campaigned in support of Jon Cruddas's unsuccessful bid to become Labour deputy leader.

== Political career ==
=== Early parliamentary career ===
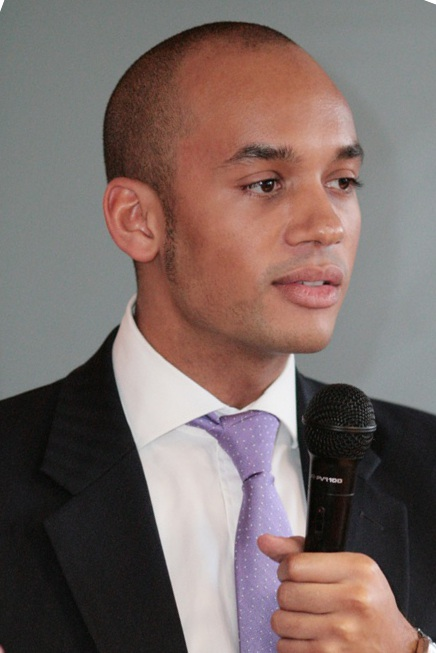
Umunna in 2009

In March 2008, Umunna was adopted as the Labour Party's prospective parliamentary candidate for Streatham. At the 2010 general election, he was elected Member of Parliament (MP) for Streatham with a 3,259 majority; he gave his maiden speech on 2 June 2010. He took a particular interest in economic policy and reform of the City.

Umunna described himself as being "One Nation Labour" and has written articles promoting the "Blue Labour" trend. He argued the Conservative-led coalition government should revise its programme of fiscal consolidation, take a tougher stance with the British banking industry and take action to transform the credit ratings agency market.

Umunna was one of 63 Labour MPs to nominate Ed Miliband in the 2010 Labour leadership election to succeed Gordon Brown as party leader.

In June 2010, Umunna was elected as a member of the Treasury Select Committee. In January 2011, he questioned the chief executive of Barclays, Bob Diamond, in relation to alleged tax avoidance activities by the bank during which he disclosed that the bank used over 300 subsidiary companies in offshore jurisdictions. In response to his question, Diamond stated in February 2011 that Barclays had paid £113m in UK corporation tax in 2009, despite making £11.6bn in profit. Umunna held this position on the Select Committee until his appointment as Shadow Minister for Small Business and Enterprise.

=== Shadow Cabinet ===
In October 2010, following Miliband's election as party leader, Umunna was appointed to serve as his Parliamentary Private Secretary and, in May 2011, he was appointed to the position of Shadow Minister for Small Business and Enterprise until his promotion to the Shadow cabinet.

Umunna was promoted as Shadow Business Secretary on 7 October 2011, replacing John Denham, who announced his retirement from front-bench politics. Following his appointment, Umunna re-affirmed Labour's commitment to introducing a graduate tax in place of university tuition fees. In January 2012, Umunna joined Ed Miliband and Shadow Chief Secretary to the Treasury Rachel Reeves in calling on PM David Cameron to block a £1.6m bonus for Stephen Hester, the chief executive officer of the publicly owned Royal Bank of Scotland Group. During 2013, Umunna led claims that the Government's valuation of the Royal Mail during its privatisation had effectively "shortchanged" the taxpayer, a view supported by the significant rise in the share price following the sale and the subsequent summoning of bankers to a parliamentary investigation.

A member of the Labour Friends of Israel, he and Liam Byrne made an official visit to Israel in October 2012 as part of the LFI's UK-Israel Economic Dialogue group. Whilst a member of LFI, he condemned Israel's military courts for their treatment of Palestinian children accused of combat offences in December 2013.

In April 2013, Umunna's law firm was linked to favourable updates made on his Wikipedia page in 2007, which included a reference to him being tipped as the "British Barack Obama". He admitted that his aides had probably set up and edited his Wikipedia page. In the same month, Umunna was criticised for comments he had made in his mid 20s on the exclusive social network ASmallWorld about the West End of London. Conservative MP Chris Heaton-Harris said the 2006 comments, describing people visiting nightclubs in the West End as "trash" and "c-list wannabes", showed a "lack of respect for the public"; Umunna stated that the comments were meant to have been "light-hearted in tone and context" but appreciated that "the choice of words used were not appropriate" and apologised for any offence.

Umunna was accused of hypocrisy for accepting a £20,000 gift from a gambling executive despite campaigning against the spread of betting shops in his constituency and promising new powers to limit them.

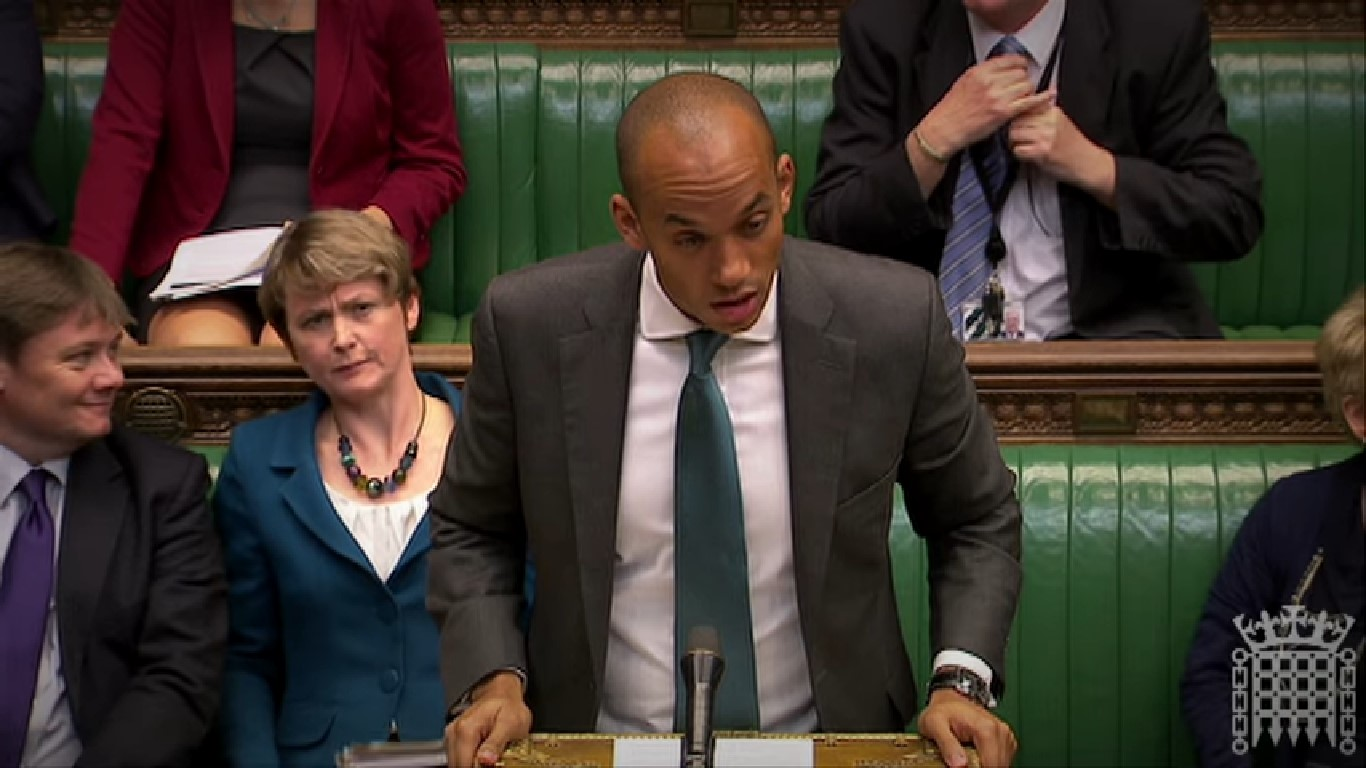
Umunna asking a question on Employment Law, circa 2012

In early May 2014, Umunna raised concerns in Parliament and public over the proposed takeover of AstraZeneca, by the American pharmaceutical giant Pfizer, on the grounds of ensuring British jobs and interests. Despite assurances from Pfizer, Umunna went on to publicly denounce the proposed takeover proclaiming that Pfizer's assurances were "not worth the paper they were written on". The takeover bid eventually fell through in late May 2014 after the AstraZeneca board rejected Pfizer's final offer.

In May 2014, Umunna criticised fellow Shadow Health Secretary Andy Burnham's report into possible methods of restricting the sale and advertising of alcohol, unhealthy foods, and tobacco. He was quoted as having said that such courses of action as outlined in the report would be seen to be "anti-business and interventionist".

Umunna has argued for a British federal state on multiple occasions, and has said that progressives should not dismiss George Osborne's notion of a "Northern Powerhouse", arguing that greater devolution, federalisation of the UK Labour Party into individual Labour Parties representing each component nation of the UK, greater political autonomy for England in particular, more regional powers and "wholescale federalisation" are necessary to advance the Labour Party.

=== Leadership election and withdrawal ===
Umunna increased his majority to 13,934 at the 2015 general election, with 53% of the vote in his constituency. Following Labour's defeat in the election and resignation of Ed Miliband as leader, Umunna was identified as one of the potential candidates to take over as leader of the party. He called for Labour to target Conservatives and "aspirational, middle-class voters", saying that the party needs to be "on the side of those who are doing well." On 12 May, he announced his candidature for the Labour Party leadership election. Three days later, he withdrew from the contest, stating that he had been "uncomfortable" with "the added level of scrutiny that came with being a leadership candidate". On 26 May, he announced his endorsement of Liz Kendall, who was unsuccessful in her bid for the Labour leadership.

=== Return to the backbenches ===
In September 2015, following the election of Jeremy Corbyn as the Leader of the Labour Party, Umunna announced his resignation from the Shadow Cabinet and returned to the backbenches, citing differences over the Brexit referendum and issues of collective ministerial responsibility.

Umunna supported "Remain" in the Brexit referendum. His constituency voted with the highest proportion of votes to remain, with 79.5%. Following the victory for the Leave campaign, Umunna proposed an amendment to the bill to trigger Article 50 calling upon the government to investigate spending £350 million a week on the NHS, which was defeated by the government. He subsequently voted for the unmodified bill to leave the EU, writing with Wes Streeting that "as democrats we must abide by the national result". In the 2017 general election campaign Umunna opposed a second referendum on Brexit.

Following his re-election in the 2017 general election, Umunna proposed a rebel amendment to the Queen's Speech calling upon the government to "rule out withdrawal from the EU without a deal" and "set out proposals to remain within the Customs Union and Single Market". Three Labour frontbenchers were sacked for supporting the defeated amendment, which the Labour leadership argued conflicted with their manifesto commitment to end freedom of movement.

On 15 April 2018, Umunna attended the launch event of the People's Vote, a campaign group calling for a public vote on the final Brexit deal between the UK and the European Union. Umunna favours a second referendum on Brexit. Umunna wrote that the campaign to leave the EU lied during the campaign and also broke the law spending more money than was allowed. Umunna has stated that the British people now know the truth and should have a second say over whether the UK leaves the European Union. In July 2018, Umunna wrote, "If the proposals which the PM is pursuing feel unacceptable to the majority of the electorate, that says something. People voted to leave and to remain for very different reasons, but it's nonsense to say that every single person who voted for Brexit in the EU referendum did so because they unanimously agreed on leaving the single market and the customs union, putting the Good Friday Agreement at risk, garnering no extra money for the NHS (contrary to what they were told) and potentially continuing years of austerity."

In August 2018, The Guardian reported that "Umunna and fellow Labour MP Chris Leslie are widely believed to be laying the groundwork for the creation of a new [political] party although both have denied this." In October 2018, it was announced that Umunna would serve as the chairman of a new centrist think tank called Progressive Centre UK. It was revealed that he would be earning £65,000 a year for his work on the advisory board.

=== Change UK ===
On 18 February 2019, Umunna and six other MPs (Luciana Berger, Chris Leslie, Angela Smith, Mike Gapes, Gavin Shuker, and Ann Coffey) quit Labour in protest at Jeremy Corbyn's leadership to form The Independent Group (later Change UK). The Independent Group named Umunna as its Spokesman on 28 February 2019.

On 24 May 2019, Umunna wrote in the i newspaper that Change UK would be open to a pro-EU pact with the Liberal Democrats in order to unite the Remain vote. On 4 June, after Change UK's poor results in the EU election, Umunna left the party with five of its other MPs who did not wish for Change UK to stand candidates at future elections. Subsequently, Change UK's new leader, Anna Soubry, said that Umunna had made a "serious mistake" in leaving the party.

=== Liberal Democrats ===
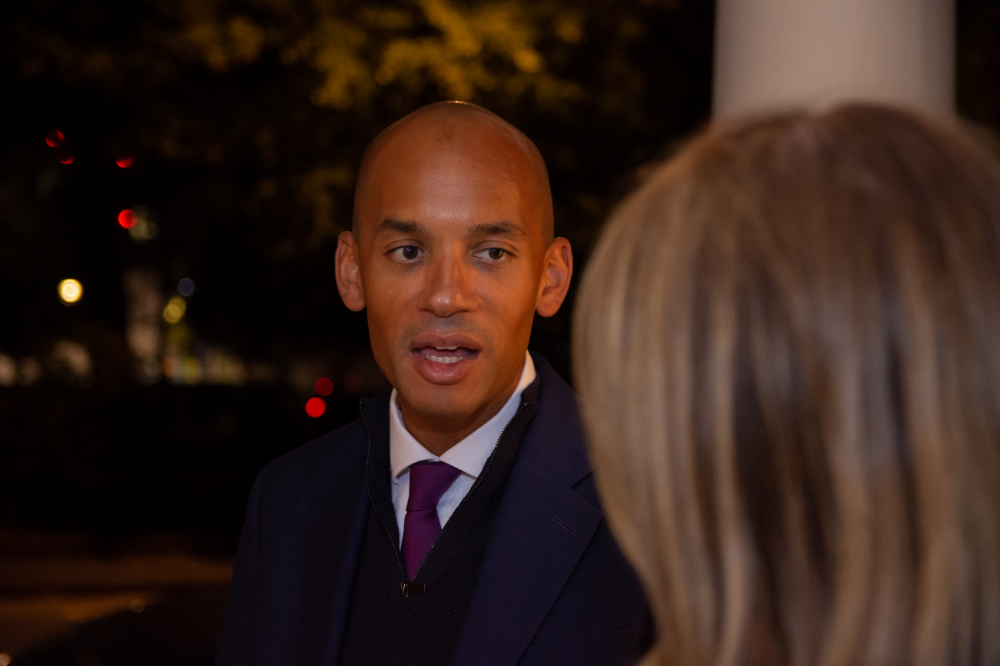
Umunna campaigning as a Liberal Democrat in Pimlico, Cities of London and Westminster at the 2019 general election

On 13 June 2019, Umunna announced to The Times he would be joining the Liberal Democrats. He told the BBC he had been "wrong" to think "millions of politically homeless people wanted a new party", while referring to moving from Change UK. He also said he "massively underestimated just how difficult it is to set up a fully fledged new party without an existing infrastructure", after Change UK received a mere 3.4% of the vote in the EU elections, far behind the Liberal Democrats' 20%. He added, under Britain's voting system, there would not be "room for more than one centre ground" party in a general election.

Though Umunna had previously been publicly critical of the Liberal Democrats for "enabling Tory austerity" during the 2010 to 2015 coalition government, he told the BBC that "things have changed." He also speculated that "a good handful" of other MPs may defect to the Liberal Democrats.

In September 2019, in his first major speech to the Liberal Democrat Federal Conference, Umunna argued Britain was unable to exert its moral authority against authoritarian leaders in the world at a time when Prime Minister Boris Johnson was threatening to break the law over Brexit.

At the 2019 general election, Umunna stood in Cities of London and Westminster, and lost to the Conservative Party candidate, Nickie Aiken, finishing second with 30.7%. Helen Thompson replaced him as the Lib Dem candidate in Streatham, and also lost.

== Business career ==
Since April 2020, Umunna has been a non-executive director of Advanced and an adviser to Digital Identity Net UK.

In July 2020 Umunna was appointed executive director and head of the Environmental, Social, Governance (ESG) consultancy within the specialist capital markets and financial services team at public relations and marketing consultancy firm Edelman UK. Umunna said about the appointment "If we're to fundamentally change the model of capitalism we've got to ensure that the overwhelming majority of businesses are integrating ESG factors into corporate decision making like never before."

On 12 April 2021 he joined the investment bank JPMorgan Chase as Managing Director and the head of its ESG advisory efforts in Europe, the Middle East and Africa, and co-leading the global ESG investment banking team. In 2022, Umunna was part of the JPMorgan team advising Vesa Equity, the investment business of Daniel Kretinsky, on their British investments which included 23% of Royal Mail. He has been criticised by newspapers for being extremely highly paid in the banking industry despite prior criticism of the industry's high pay.

== Personal life ==
In 2015, Umunna announced his engagement to employment lawyer Alice Sullivan in The Times. They married in 2016. Their first daughter was born in 2017, and their second was born in March 2020. A third daughter was born in late 2024.

He is a Crystal Palace F.C. fan. He has said that his politics and moral values come from Christianity, but that he is "not majorly religious".

Several years before he left politics, Umunna was cited as one of the Top 100 most influential Africans by New African magazine in 2015.

Parliament of the United Kingdom
Preceded by Keith Hill	Member of Parliament for Streatham; 2010–2019	Succeeded by Bell Ribeiro-Addy
Political offices
Preceded by John Denham	Shadow Secretary of State for Business, Innovation and Skills; 2011–2015	Succeeded by Angela Eagle
