= Sir Tim O'Brien, 3rd Baronet =

English cricketer

Tim O'Brien
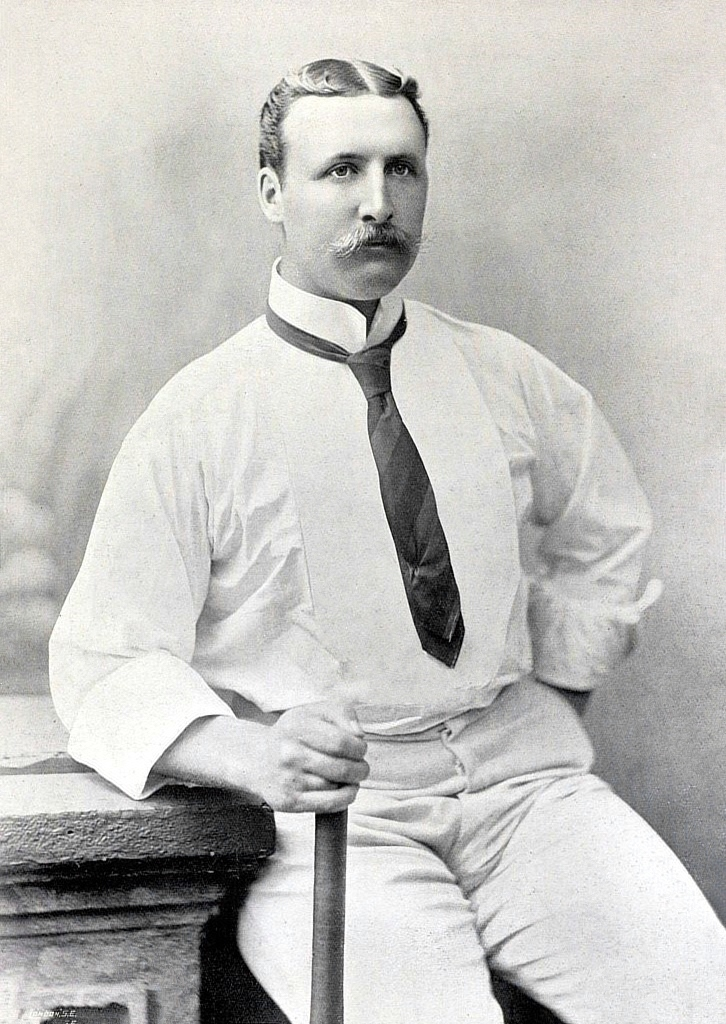

Personal information
- Full name: Timothy Carew O'Brien
- Born: 5 November 1861; Dublin, Ireland
- Died: 9 December 1948 (aged 87); Ramsey, Isle of Man
- Batting: Right-handed
- Bowling: Left-arm
- Relatives: John O'Brien (brother)

International information
- National side: England
- Test debut (cap 44): 10 July 1884 v Australia
- Last Test: 23 March 1896 v South Africa

Domestic team information
- Years: Team
- 1881–1898: Middlesex
- 1884–1885: Oxford University
- 1902–1907: Ireland

Career statistics
Competition	Test	First-class
Matches	5	266
Runs scored	59	11,397
Batting average	7.37	27.00
100s/50s	0/0	15/58
Top score	20	202
Balls bowled	–	484
Wickets	–	4
Bowling average	–	85.00
5 wickets in innings	–	0
10 wickets in match	–	0
Best bowling	–	1/10
Catches/stumpings	4/–	173/2
- Source: ESPN Cricinfo, 11 November 2008

Sir Timothy Carew O'Brien, 3rd Baronet (5 November 1861 – 9 December 1948) was an Irish baronet who played cricket for England in five Test matches.

== Life and career ==
Tim O'Brien was born in Dublin and educated at the Catholic school Downside in Somerset. He went to New Inn Hall, Oxford, principally in order to further his cricket career.

A forceful right-handed batsman, O'Brien won a Blue in 1884 and 1885. He went on to play 266 first-class cricket matches as an amateur for Oxford University and in fairly regular appearances for Middlesex through to 1898. His 92 for Oxford against the 1884 Australians was instrumental in the university's only victory over an Australian team. He played for England against Australia at Old Trafford that year and again four years later at Lord's, but in neither game did his distinguish himself.

He toured with Marylebone Cricket Club (MCC) teams twice: in 1887–88 he went with George Vernon to Australia and in 1895–96 he went with Lord Hawke's side to South Africa, where he acted as captain once against South Africa at Port Elizabeth in February 1896, winning the game largely as a result of George Lohmann's match return of 15/45 (7/38 and 8/7).

In county cricket, he was known for hard hitting innings, with a highest score of 202, scored as part of a partnership with Robert Slade Lucas that put on 338 in 200 minutes against Sussex in 1895.

Uniquely, O'Brien captained Ireland as well as England, recording a top score of 167 against his alma mater for the country of his birth during a brief Irish tour of England. This remained an Irish record until 1973.

O'Brien married Gundrede Annette Teresa de Trafford, daughter of Sir Humphrey de Trafford 2nd baronet on 26 September 1885 at All Saints Church, Barton-upon-Irwell and they had 10 children, one of whom, Timothy Jnr., died in Flanders during the First World War. Another child, daughter Sicele O'Brien was a well known pioneer pilot. Sir Timothy was, at the time of his death in 1948, the oldest cricketer to have played in England-Australia Tests. His brother John also played international cricket for Ireland.

Baronetage of the United Kingdom
Preceded by Patrick O'Brien	Baronet (of Merrion Square and Boris-in-Ossory); 1895–1948	Succeeded by Robert O'Brien
