= John Norman (cricketer) =

English cricketer and dentist

Personal information
- Full name: John William Norman
- Born: 22 August 1936 (age 90); Maidstone, Kent, England
- Batting: Right-handed

Domestic team information
- Years: Team
- 1957: Cambridge University
- 1966: Berkshire

Career statistics
Competition	First-class
Matches	2
Runs scored	12
Batting average	4.00
100s/50s	–/–
Top score	9
Catches/stumpings	3/–
- Source: Cricinfo, 17 January 2019

John William Norman (born 22 August 1936) is an English retired dentist and former first-class cricketer.

Born at Maidstone, Norman was educated at Downside School, before moving to Millfield School in September 1954 in order to improve his chances of entering the University of Cambridge to study medicine. He played rugby union at Millfield as a scrum-half, a position he had played in for three years at Downside. He succeeded in entering Cambridge University, where he graduated from as a dentist in 1956. While at Cambridge he played two first-class cricket matches as a wicket-keeper for Cambridge University Cricket Club in 1957, against Kent and Middlesex. He later played a Minor Counties Championship match for Berkshire in 1966.
