= Ralph Clutton =

English cricketer

Personal information
- Full name: Ralph Louis Clutton
- Born: 23 December 1902; British Hong Kong
- Died: 29 September 1957 (aged 54); St Leonards-on-Sea, Sussex, England
- Batting: Right-handed
- Bowling: Left-arm medium

Domestic team information
- Years: Team
- 1923: Bedfordshire
- 1926/27: Europeans

Career statistics
Competition	First-class
Matches	1
Runs scored	0
Batting average	0.00
100s/50s	–/–
Top score	0
Balls bowled	6
Wickets	0
Bowling average	–
5 wickets in innings	–
10 wickets in match	–
Best bowling	–
Catches/stumpings	1/–
- Source: Cricinfo, 27 July 2019

Ralph Louis Clutton (23 December 1902 – 29 September 1957) was an English first-class cricketer.

The son of Captain Ralph Philip Clutton, he was born at British Hong Kong in December 1902. He was educated in England at Downside School. He later played a single first-class cricket match for the Europeans cricket team in British India against the touring Marylebone Cricket Club at Karachi in October 1926. Batting once in the match, he was dismissed without scoring by George Geary in the Europeans' only innings. In addition to playing first-class cricket, Clutton also played minor counties cricket for Bedfordshire in 1923, making a single appearance in the Minor Counties Championship. During the Second World War, Clutton was commissioned as a lieutenant in the Royal Artillery on 4 May 1940. He died at St Leonards-on-Sea in September 1959.
