= The Hole (2001 film) =

2001 British film by Nick Hamm

- Theatrical release poster
- Directed by: Nick Hamm
- Screenplay by: Ben Court; Caroline Ip
- Based on: After the Hole by Guy Burt
- Produced by: Lisa Bryer; Jeremy Bolt; Pippa Cross
- Starring: Thora Birch; Desmond Harrington; Daniel Brocklebank; Laurence Fox; Keira Knightley; Embeth Davidtz
- Cinematography: Denis Crossan
- Edited by: Niven Howie
- Music by: Clint Mansell
- Production companies: The Film Council; Le Studio Canal+; Cowboy Films; Granada Film Productions; Impact Pictures
- Distributed by: Pathé Distribution
- Release date: 20 April 2001 (United Kingdom)
- Running time: 102 minutes
- Country: United Kingdom
- Language: English
- Box office: $7.8 million

The Hole is a 2001 British psychological thriller film directed by Nick Hamm, based on the 1993 novel After the Hole by Guy Burt. The film stars Thora Birch, Desmond Harrington, Daniel Brocklebank, Laurence Fox, Keira Knightley, and Embeth Davidtz. Filmed in 2000, the film featured Thora Birch in the lead role, which was attributed to her appearance in American Beauty (1999). It also marked Knightley's first major role in a feature film.

The Hole was released in the United Kingdom on 20 April 2001 and grossed a total of $7.8 million. Dimension Films, which in October 2001 acquired the rights to distribute the film theatrically in the United States, never did so; it was instead released direct-to-video nearly two years later, by Dimension's then-fellow Disney subsidiary Buena Vista Distribution. The film was shot at Bray Studios and various locations around southern England, including Downside School in Somerset.

== Plot ==
Private school student Liz resurfaces, disheveled and bloody, after disappearing 18 days prior, along with her peers Mike, Geoff and Frankie. She appears traumatized and exhibits visible discomfort during her physical examination when doctors attempt to take a rape kit. Liz is then interviewed by a psychiatrist, Dr. Phillipa Horwood. Liz portrays herself as unpopular at school, but having an in with the socialite Frankie (who apparently both pities her and uses her for coursework), as well as a desperate crush on popular rich student Mike. Liz's friend, Martin, operates as a sort of "fixer" at the school, doing favours for other students in exchange for money. When Mike and his friend (and Frankie's boyfriend) Geoff approach Martin to ask him to help them skip a field trip, he arranges for the three of them to spend the weekend in an abandoned underground nuclear fallout shelter, adding Liz to the group as a "kindred spirit", thereby giving her an opportunity to get closer to Mike. He brings the four to the shelter, collects payment and locks them in.

When Martin fails to return for them at the arranged time and date, the four realise they are trapped and begin to turn on one another. Liz notices a shadow crossing the slit in the shelter's door, which prompts her to tell Mike that she believes Martin is watching them and that he has locked them in out of jealousy, as he has had unrequited romantic feelings for Liz since childhood and does not want her to succeed in winning over Mike. Looking around the shelter, Liz and Mike discover hidden microphones, seemingly placed there by Martin, and alert Geoff and Frankie to the situation. Liz then devises a plan to get Martin's attention. Frankie pretends to be ill, while Mike pretends to vehemently berate Liz for causing the entire situation. Liz claims that, after this, they woke up one morning and found the hatch opened, allowing them all to finally escape. She also claims that the ordeal won her Mike's affection and gratitude.

Phillipa is skeptical of Liz's version of events. Martin is subsequently taken into police custody, where he tells an entirely different story: he claims it was Liz and Frankie who orchestrated the scheme for Liz to get to know Mike better and for Frankie to spend time with Geoff. Liz is not the unpopular loner she has portrayed herself as: in fact, it is Martin who is the loner, while Liz and Frankie are the popular girls. Meanwhile, Liz returns home, where she experiences disturbing flashbacks about what happened. An enraged Martin goes to visit Liz, believing she is framing him. She runs from him through the garden and onto a walkway above a weir. Martin cries, but Liz says she knew the police would let him go because they could not prove anything.

In the meantime, Philippa visits the shelter, accompanied by a forensic pathologist and appears visibly distraught by what she sees inside. She then visits Liz's home, finding her crying in the aftermath of the earlier incident with Martin. Liz says that she does not feel safe and Philippa takes her away in her car, passing by Liz's mother's car in the driveway. Liz then explains that she cannot remember what happened in the shelter and asks to be taken back to jog her memory. Philippa is initially opposed to this but eventually agrees to bring Liz to the shelter, albeit without notifying anyone of their whereabouts, which prompts a panicked reaction from Liz's mother and a search by police.

Once inside the shelter, Liz reveals the truth: she was the one who locked the door from the inside, in the hopes of winning Mike's affection, as she was obsessed with him.

The initial plan was for the four friends to drink and do drugs in the shelter while the rest of the school went on the field trip. However, on the first evening, a drunken encounter between Frankie, Geoff and Mike almost leads to a threesome and Liz discovers that Frankie has slept with Mike in the past. That night, Geoff and Frankie have sex and Liz attempts to proposition Mike, much to his distaste. The next morning, an angry and frustrated Mike decides to leave. Liz initially says she will leave with him and desperately attempts to salvage the situation by asking him out for a pizza, but he says that he is going to try to reconnect with his ex, whom he recently broke up with. Geoff and Frankie then make a last-ditch attempt to try to persuade him to stay so as not to blow their covers, giving Liz the opportunity to climb up to the door unnoticed and lock it, pretending that she cannot open it. The realisation that they are unable to escape throws the group into hysteria, although they eventually ration out their food and water, in the hopes that someone will notice them missing and come looking for them.

After a few days, Mike eventually shows interest in Liz. The two start kissing and are about to have sex when Geoff interrupts them to tell them that Frankie is very ill and is unable to stop vomiting. Liz is initially oblivious to her friend's plight and gushes about her encounter with Mike but eventually tells her that she believes rescue is near and asks whether she can hold on a little longer. That night, Mike and Liz have sex. Afterwards, Liz, having achieved her goal, decides to unlock the door but realises that Frankie is not in her bed, only to find her dead in the shelter's toilet. A flash forward to the present day shows Frankie's body in the morgue, with the forensic pathologist explaining to Philippa that she had bulimia, meaning that the constant vomiting increased her dehydration, tore the lining of her stomach and put a great strain on her heart, which led to cardiac arrest.

Liz, Mike and Geoff gradually run out of food and water. Attempting to stop the situation from deteriorating further, Liz tries to tell Mike that she has had the key all along, when he overhears Geoff opening a can of Coca-Cola he had been hoarding in his backpack. Mike attacks Geoff in a fit of rage and kills him by beating his head repeatedly on the floor (with another flash forward to Geoff's body at the morgue). After a few more days, Liz suggests a suicide pact whereupon Mike tries to dissuade her, saying that she's the only thing that has kept him going and professing his love for her. After he falls asleep, Liz finally climbs up the ladder to the shelter's entrance and unlocks the door. When Mike asks her how she managed this, she explains that she has had the key all along and that the entire ordeal was a plan to get close to him. Enraged at the fact that she allowed their friends to die, Mike attempts to chase after her, rapidly climbing the ladder (which has previously been shown as unstable) and causing it to break. He falls and is fatally impaled by the broken ladder.

Initially devastated, Liz tells herself that this is for the best, as it means that Mike will never grow old or cheat on her and remain perfect in her memory instead. After she finishes recounting the story, Phillipa asks her to make an official statement, corroborating Martin's version of events and taking responsibility for what happened. Liz refuses, stating that it was all an accident and not worth ruining her life over. A flashback also reveals that she murdered Martin when he visited her the day before by pushing him into the weir. Police arrive at the shelter and Liz begins calling for help, pretending that Phillipa is attempting to hurt her. Meanwhile, Martin's corpse is fished out of the weir and, in his pocket, the police find the key to the shelter which seemingly implicates him in the events. The police attribute his death to suicide due to guilt and indicate that Philippa is in trouble. Philippa and Liz are brought outside, where Philippa sits in the open boot of a police car, while one of the officers comforts Liz as she sits in the back of an ambulance. When the officer turns away, Philippa looks over to Liz, who smirks knowingly at her.

== Cast ==
- Thora Birch as Elizabeth "Liz" Dunn
- Desmond Harrington as Michael "Mike" Steel
- Daniel Brocklebank as Martin Taylor
- Laurence Fox as Geoffrey "Geoff" Bingham
- Keira Knightley as Frances "Frankie" Almond Smith
- Embeth Davidtz as Dr. Philippa Horwood
- Steven Waddington as DCS Tom Howard
- Gemma Craven as Mrs. Dunn
- Anastasia Hille as Forensic Pathologist Gillian
- Kelly Hunter as DI Chapman

== Production ==
Nick Hamm began casting actors at the end of 1999. Hamm described newcomer Keira Knightley as a young version of Julie Christie. To prepare for the role, Thora Birch visited an English public school. Principal photography, which lasted six weeks, began on 2 July 2000 and ended on 9 November 2000. It took place around London and southern England with specific locations, including Downside Boarding School in Somerset, Royal Grammar School, High Wycombe, Shenley Hall, Hertfordshire and Bray Studios. The film was shot in Super 35 format.

== Reception ==
On Rotten Tomatoes, the film has an approval rating of 53% based on reviews from 17 critics.

Michael Thomson, in a review for the BBC, said the film was a "dark, grisly adventure" influenced by William Golding's novel Lord of the Flies, with the hole substituting for the island setting. He criticized the camerawork and some of the dialogue, but praised Thora Birch.
