= Hilda Harding =

Bank Manager

Hilda Millicent Harding (10 September 1915 – 26 December 1998) was appointed by Barclays Bank as Britain’s first female bank manager. She was the great-aunt of British children’s author Robin Bennett.

== Career ==
=== Progression ===
Harding joined the High Wycombe branch of Barclays Bank as a shorthand typist, on 18 June 1934. She earned £50 per annum (equivalent to £3,188.14 in 2026). In 1939, she transferred to Henley-on-Thames branch as a ledger clerk; in 1941 she was appointed secretary to the local Directors at Reading. After the Second World War, in 1947, she was one of the first women to attend the Barclays training school at Chester House, Wimbledon, and the following year; she transferred to Barclays Head Office as secretary to a senior executive. In 1950, she attended the administrative staff college at Henley on Thames (now Henley Business School). Finally, on 15 May 1958, she was announced as Barclays' first female bank manager, at the planned new Hanover Square branch in London.

=== Hanover Square branch ===
The new branch opened in December 1958, with a staff of six including two female deputies.

=== Retirement ===
Harding retired on 10 September 1970. She lived at Shiplake, near Henley-on-Thames, and ran a market garden until her death in 1998.
