= Helenus Milmo =

British High Court Judge and lawyer

Sir Helenus Milmo DL
- Born: Helenus Padraic Seosamh Milmo; 24 August 1908; County Limerick, United Kingdom of Great Britain and Ireland
- Died: 30 August 1988 (aged 80); Chichester, West Sussex, England
- Education: Trinity College, Cambridge
- Occupation: Lawyer
- Spouse(s): Joan Frances Morley (died 1978) Mrs. Anne Brand (m. 1980)
- Relatives: Chuka Umunna (grandson)

Sir Helenus Patrick Joseph Milmo, DL (born Helenus Padraic Seosamh Milmo; 24 August 1908 – 30 August 1988) was an Irish lawyer in Britain and High Court judge.

== Early life and education ==
Milmo was born in County Limerick, Ireland, on 24 August 1908, the third son of Daniel and Kathleen (née White) Milmo, but spent his early years in Furbogh, Galway Gaeltacht. Milmo attended St Gerard's School, Downside School and Trinity College, Cambridge; he was called to the Bar as a barrister.

== Career ==
During the Second World War, Milmo was a member of MI5. Having previously worked under Kim Philby, Milmo was selected to investigate Philby in 1951, when Philby's espionage had become increasingly obvious. Milmo failed to elicit definitive answers and concluded "that Philby is and has been for many years a Soviet agent. But the case remained unproven." Milmo's peers were not entirely forgiving. "Some felt", wrote Peter Carter-Ruck when Milmo died in 1988, "that he was perhaps too much of a gentleman for that daunting task."

In 1961, Milmo was appointed a Queen's Counsel and in 1964 became a judge of the Queen's Bench Division of the High Court of Justice of England and Wales and was knighted.

== Personal life ==
A Roman Catholic, in 1933 Milmo married Joan Frances Morley, the second daughter of Francis Morley of Sloan Court, Chelsea, London. The couple had five children. His grandson Chuka Umunna was a British Member of Parliament.

Joan Milmo died in 1978, aged 71. Milmo's second marriage, in 1980, was to Anne Brand.

Sir Helenus Milmo died in 1988 in Chichester, West Sussex.
