= Robin Bennett =

British entrepreneur, writer, and documentary producer

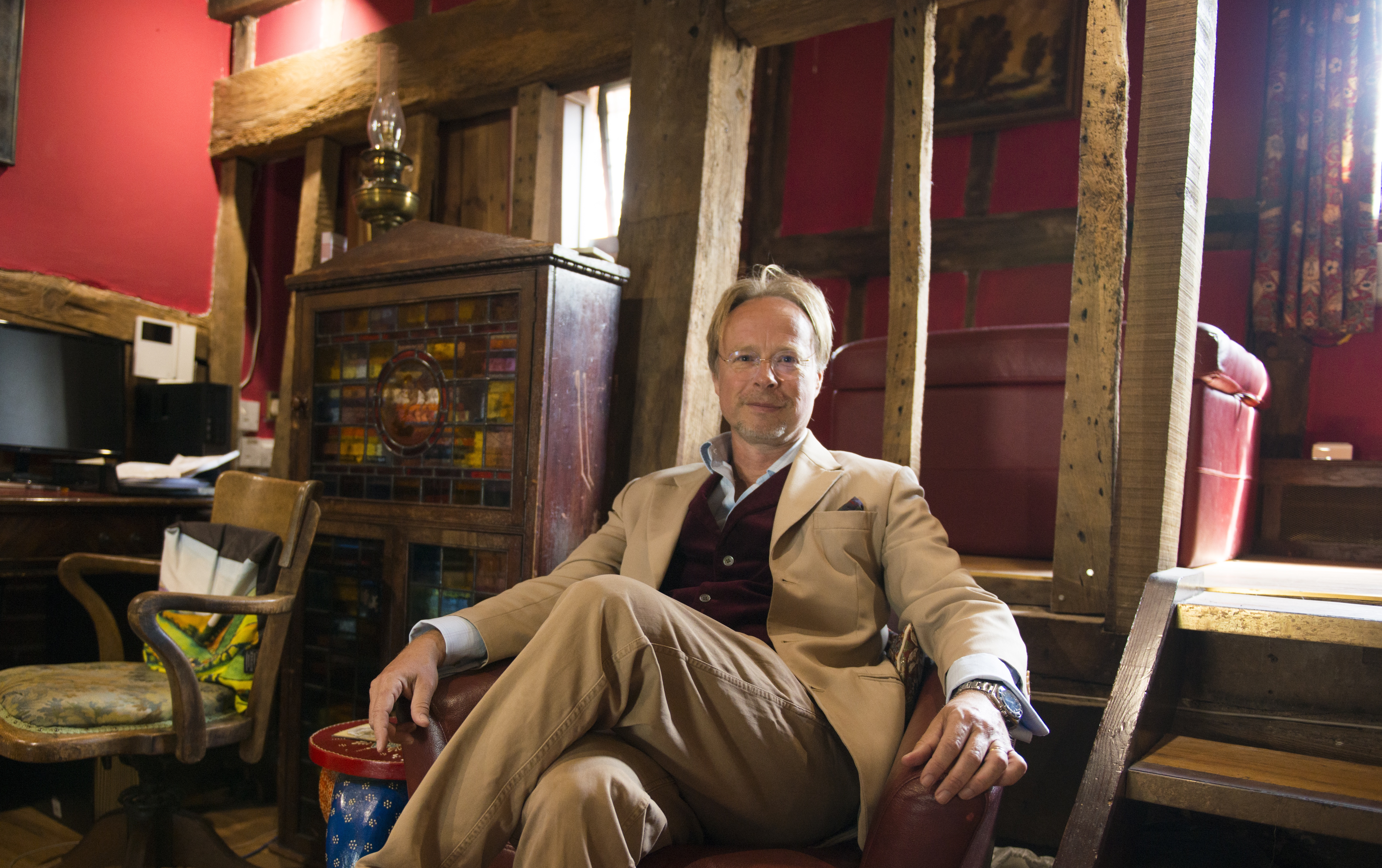
- Bennett in 2023
- Education: Royal Holloway in 1992
- Occupation: Entrepreneur

Robin Bennett is a British entrepreneur, writer, and documentary producer. He is the founder of The Bennett Group, including Aktuel Translations, a global translation company, London Tutors, River Consulting, Comp Kennels, 1155 (Charity) and Monster Books, an independent publishing house. He is the great-nephew of Hilda Harding, Britain's first female bank manager.

== Bennett Group ==
Robin Bennett attended Royal Holloway and graduated in 1992 with a degree in Modern Languages.

Translation company Aktuel Translations was founded in 1992 as part of the Bennett Group and provides translations in various fields to corporate businesses.

Other companies in the Bennett Group include London Tutors, thisisplanetearth.com, Quarto Translations, which provides translations for publishers, and Patent Translations International, which provides patent translations for legal services.

Robin has also spoken at UK universities and at conferences about how to start up a new business.

== Monster Books ==
Robin Bennett founded independent publishing house Monster Books in 1997. He has written numerous books for both children and adults.

== Publications ==
=== Non Fiction Books ===
- Alpha Dad (2005)
- Start-up Smart (2010)
- How to Make a Good Living Running Your Own Business (2012)
- Kicking the Property Ladder (2012)
- Life's a Banquet (2020)
- Rampaging Rugby (2021)
- Fantastic Football (2022)
- Cracking Cricket (2023)
- Fieldsports, Foraging and Terrible Ordeals (2023)
- The Linguist's Lexicon (2024)
- The Good Snooze Guide of Great Britain (2024)
- The Entrepreneur's Almanack (2025)

=== Fiction Books ===
- Creake Castle: The Pepper King (2007)
- Creake Castle: Tobias Brown, Inventor Esquire (2007)
- Creake Castle: Miles Byfar and the Christmas Spirit (2011)
- Small Vampires: Picus the Thief (2011)
- The Angel of Mons (2013)
- Small Vampires: Mousch the Crooked (2013)
- Iron Knights (2013)
- Small Vampires: Raptor the Avenger (2015)
- The Hairy Hand (2019)
- Space Dragons (2019)
- Monster Max Series (2021, 2022, 2023)
- XII (2022)
- Lief the Lesser (2023)
- Tucker's Time Machine Telescope (2025)
- Dreadnought (2026)

==== Picture books ====
- Fairy Tales and Other (1997)
- Nervus Rex and other Rhymes (2002)
- Bad Boris (2007)
- Bullets and Bones (2007)
- Pippin and the Moon (2007)
- Quincy Duff and the Tangley Lane Trio (2007)
- SPLAT! (2018)

==== Audiobooks ====
- Buk (2013), narrated by Imogen Stubbs
- Monster Max and the Bobble Hat of Forgetting (2021), narrated by Robin Bennett
- Rampaging Rugby (2021), narrated by Robin Bennett and Conrad Smith

==== Films ====
- Fantastic Britain (2016), writer and producer

== Accolades ==
Robin Bennett was listed in the Who's Who of British Business in 2003.

His novel Picus the Thief was longlisted for the British Fantasy Award 2012 and won the Writer Magazine Indie Book of the Year Award 2012.

His children's book The Hairy Hand was longlisted for The Times/Chicken House Children's Fiction Competition 2013.

In May 2016 his documentary "Fantastic Britain", about the British obsession with magic and folklore, won an "Award of Excellence" at the Hollywood International Independent Documentary Awards (HIIDA).
