= Smythe baronets =

Extinct baronetcy in the Baronetage of England

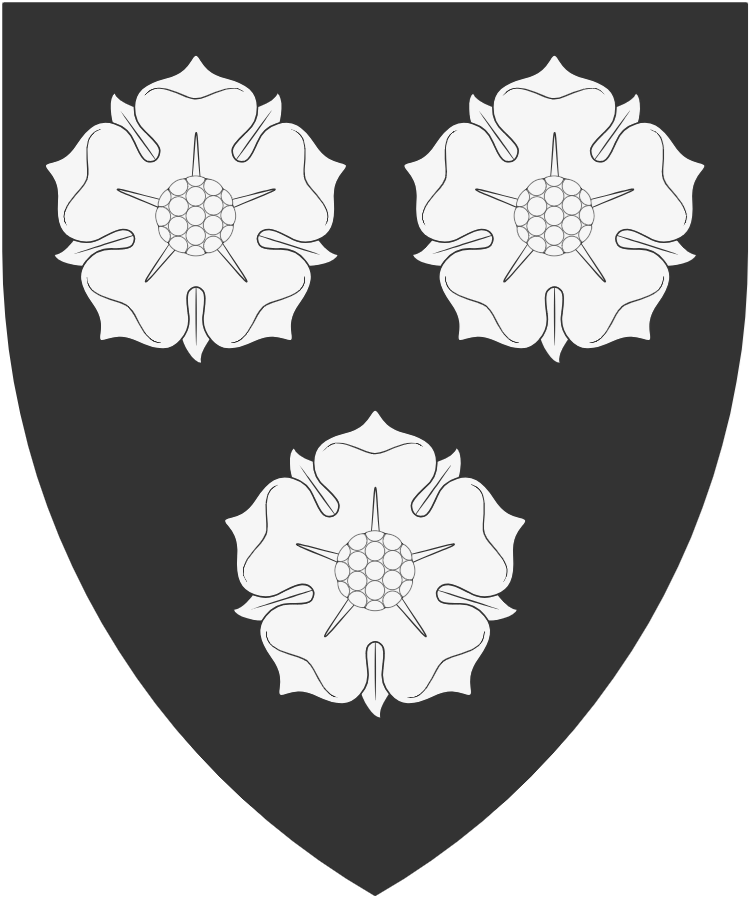
Arms of Smythe of Eshe Hall: Sable, three roses argent.

There has been one creation of baronet with the surname Smythe (as distinct from Smyth and Smith). It was created in the Baronetage of England for Edward Smythe on 23 February 1661.

The Smythes, a Roman Catholic family, were descended from William Smythe of Nunstainton, County Durham who married Margaret Eshe, heiress of Eshe Hall, and who was credited in the 1569 Rising of the North. During the English Civil War, the Smythes were loyal Royalists, and their estates were subject to sequestration in 1644 during the period of the Commonwealth of England. On the Restoration of Charles II, Edward Smythe was created a baronet in recognition of the family loyalty to the Crown.

The first baronet married Mary Lee, heiress of Acton Burnell Castle, Shropshire which became his principal seat. The sixth baronet was High Sheriff of Shropshire in 1831 and the seventh Baronet was high sheriff in 1867.

Mrs Fitzherbert, wife of King George IV, was the eldest child of William Smythe of Brambridge, Hampshire, and Mary Ann Errington. Her paternal grandparents were Sir John Smythe, 3rd Baronet, and Constantia Blount.

== Smythe of Eshe Hall, Durham (1661) ==
- Sir Edward Smythe, 1st Baronet (died 12 October 1714)
- Sir Richard Smythe, 2nd Baronet (died December 1736)
- Sir John Smythe, 3rd Baronet (died 17 September 1737 )
- Sir Edward Smythe, 4th Baronet (21 October 1719 – 2 November 1784)
- Sir Edward Smythe, 5th Baronet (21 May 1758 – 11 April 1811)
- Sir Edward Joseph Smythe, 6th Baronet (3 August 1787 – 11 March 1856)
- Sir Charles Frederick Joseph Smythe, 7th Baronet (16 March 1819 – 14 November 1897)
- Sir John Walter Smythe, 8th Baronet (7 November 1827 – 5 March 1919)
- Sir Edward Walter Joseph Patrick Herbert Smythe, 9th Baronet (20 March 1869 – 9 March 1942; title extinct on his death)

== Coat of arms ==
Coat of arms of Smythe baronets
Crest A stag's head erased gorged with a wreath of laurel all ppr. Escutcheon Sable three roses argent barbed and seeded ppr. Motto Regi semper fidelis

== See also ==
- Smyth baronets
- Smith baronets
