= Guy Burt =

British writer

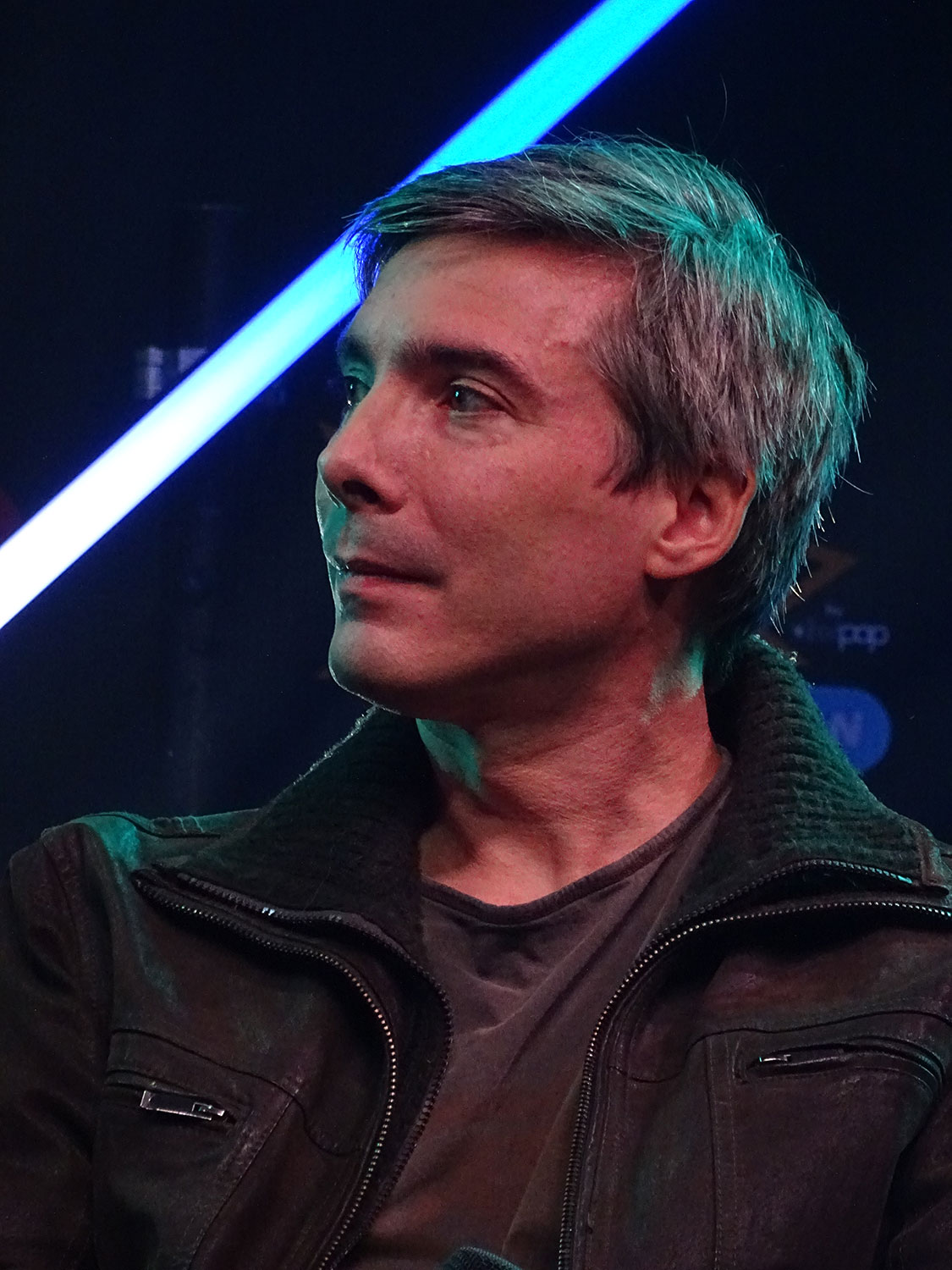
- Guy Burt at MCM London Oct 2019
- Born: England
- Occupation: writer
- Years active: 1993 – present

Guy Burt (born 14 July 1972) is an English author and BAFTA award-winning screenwriter who has worked on series such as The Borgias, and Wire in the Blood and the Alex Rider TV series.

== Early life ==
Burt wrote his first novel during his gap year from school, when he was 18. He read English literature at Oxford University and eventually became a teacher like his parents, although he left after five years so he could pursue full-time writing.

== Career ==
Burt wrote his debut novel, After the Hole, in 1993, a psychological horror story about a group of private school students trapped in an underground bunker, seemingly locked in by a deranged, sociopathic classmate. He won the Betty Trask Award in 1994 for this work, which was adapted into the film, The Hole (2001), starring Thora Birch and Daniel Brocklebank. He has since published three more novels, Sophie (1994), The Dandelion Clock (1999) and The Glass Field (2026).

Burt has also written extensively for television, contributing episodes of Afterlife, Diamond Geezer, Ghostboat, Kingdom, Murder in Mind and Grace; creating original dramas such as The Bletchley Circle, Tutankhamun and the children's drama Harriet's Army (for which he won a Best Writer BAFTA in 2015); and adapting others' work for screen, including Joana Nadin's novel Joe All Alone (which won the Children's Drama BAFTA in 2018) and acting as writer and showrunner of the Alex Rider television series (working with actor Stephen Dillane and Anthony Horowitz, the author of the Alex Rider book series).

In May 2026 he published his first novel in 27 years, The Glass Field. The book is a work of literary fiction. Set in 1986, it follows the characters Scott and Jodie, two damaged outsiders who believe nuclear war is inevitable. Their shared vision of a broken future becomes a way of dealing with personal grief and isolation.
