= After the Hole =

1993 psychological horror novel by Guy Burt

- First edition
- Author: Guy Burt
- Genre: Psychological horror
- Publisher: Black Swan
- Publication date: 11 February 1993
- Publication place: United Kingdom
- Media type: Print
- Pages: 160
- ISBN: 0-552-99531-2

After the Hole (also known as The Hole) is a 1993 psychological horror novel by English author Guy Burt. The book tells the story of a group of private school students who find themselves trapped in the school's abandoned cellar, seemingly locked in by their deranged classmate. The book received mixed reviews, but won a Betty Trask Award in 1994. The book was loosely adapted into a 2001 film directed by Nick Hamm, with a few changes such as "The Hole" being an abandoned underground bunker, while it was a cellar in the book.

== Plot summary ==
At an English public school, five students – Liz (the narrator of many flash backs), Mike (the protagonist of most of the student's time in The Hole"), Alex, Frankie and Geoff – are lured into an abandoned cellar by a malevolent prankster named Martyn. All is well for the three days, in which they socialise and get to know each other better; but when three days pass and Martyn is nowhere to be seen, the group must face the possibility that they are trapped indefinitely.

Flash forwards of a "dream summer" section punctuate the story, narrated by Liz, reveal that most of them got out of the hole (Liz interacts awkwardly with Alex at one point) and Mike and Liz are now living together while Liz writes a book based on everything that happened within the Hole. Liz also keeps tapes of interviews with a girl named "Lisa" who talks of her romantic relationship with Martyn.

In the Hole, they become increasingly desperate for food, beginning to face up to the fact that Martyn's experiment was really to play God with all of them. Mike and Liz meet at night in the small bathroom section and talk a lot. At one point Mike believes he sees the keyhole of the trapdoor locking them in the Hole "winking" at him, but dismisses this on grounds that he is hallucinating, or so he thinks.

The water supplies go off. Mike tells Liz his experience with the "winking" keyhole and from this she decides that Martyn must have bugged the main room but not the bathroom area where Mike and Liz have been talking. Liz formulates a plan to test their theory, by saying how lucky they are to have light, to see if Martyn turns off the electricity. They then sleep together.

Liz follows through with it, and everything goes to plan. The electricity goes off. Liz tells the others that a friend of hers knows about the prank and if she doesn't return he will come and rescue them. Everyone rejoices, but Mike is suspicious.

Lisa's story goes on in parallel to this, via the tapes Liz has made of "interviews" she had with Lisa. On the same day Liz plots this, Lisa goes over to Martyn's house and tries to break up with him. Martyn barely listens and, in anger, rapes Lisa. After this, he walks out and supposedly never returns. Lisa goes into his office, searching for him, and sees the tapes of The Hole. She realises everything that has gone on and goes to the Hole, rescuing everyone.

At this point, Liz's narrative ends and there is an extremely ambiguous epilogue written by Dr. Phillippa Horwood, who casts the whole of Liz's testimony in doubt by saying that Michael ("Mike") Rollins died on the sixteenth day in the Hole, that Liz was the "sole survivor" and that no records of the infamous Martyn exist, heavily implying that Liz created Martyn to place blame on someone other than herself. It is also heavily implied – but never actually decided – that Liz and Lisa are the same person.
