= Ralph Prouton =

English cricketer, footballer, and teacher (1926–2018)

Personal information
- Full name: Ralph Oliver Prouton
- Born: 1 March 1926; Southampton, Hampshire, England
- Died: 12 September 2018 (aged 92); Bath, Somerset, England
- Batting: Right-handed
- Role: Wicket-keeper

Domestic team information
- Years: Team
- 1949–1954: Hampshire

Career statistics
Competition	First-class
Matches	52
Runs scored	982
Batting average	14.44
100s/50s	–/5
Top score	90
Catches/stumpings	84/13
- Source: Cricinfo, 26 July 2023

Ralph Oliver Prouton (1 March 1926 – 12 September 2018) was an English first-class cricketer and footballer.

== Sporting career and life ==
Prouton was born at Southampton in March 1926. He was recommended to Arsenal by their former captain Tom Parker. Though he did not feature for Arsenal's first team, he did play 45 times for their 'A' team and twelve times for their reserves between 1949 and 1952, playing as a left-sided wing half. Alongside his football career with Arsenal, in the summer Prouton played cricket. He made his debut in first-class cricket for Hampshire against Leicestershire at Southampton in the 1949 County Championship. It would be another two years before his next appearance for Hampshire, which came in 1951 against Oxford University. Prouton was one of a number of candidates to replace Hampshire's recently retired wicket-keeper Neil McCorkell. In 1952, he missed only three matches all season, playing in 26. This number reduced in 1953, when he made seventeen appearances, before making just three appearances in 1954. After 1954, Leo Harrison established himself as first choice wicket-keeper. Prouton made 52 first-class appearances for Hampshire, scoring 982 runs at an average of 14.44. As wicket-keeper, he took 84 catches and made thirteen stumpings. His highest first-class score of 90 was made against Leicestershire at Portsmouth in 1953. Having found opportunities at Arsenal lacking, Prouton was signed by Swindon Town in July 1952, with the club signing him during the middle of a County Championship match against Sussex at Portsmouth. He made sixteen first team appearances for Swindon Town during the 1952–53 season, including two appearances in the FA Cup. In the summer of 1953, he signed for Bath City and played for their reserves for a number of seasons.

Prouton later taught for many years at Downside School in Somerset. He maintained an association with county cricket by standing as an umpire in minor counties cricket, adjudicating in 56 matches in the Minor Counties Championship between 1957 and 1969. Prouton died at Bath in September 2018.
