= Downside School =

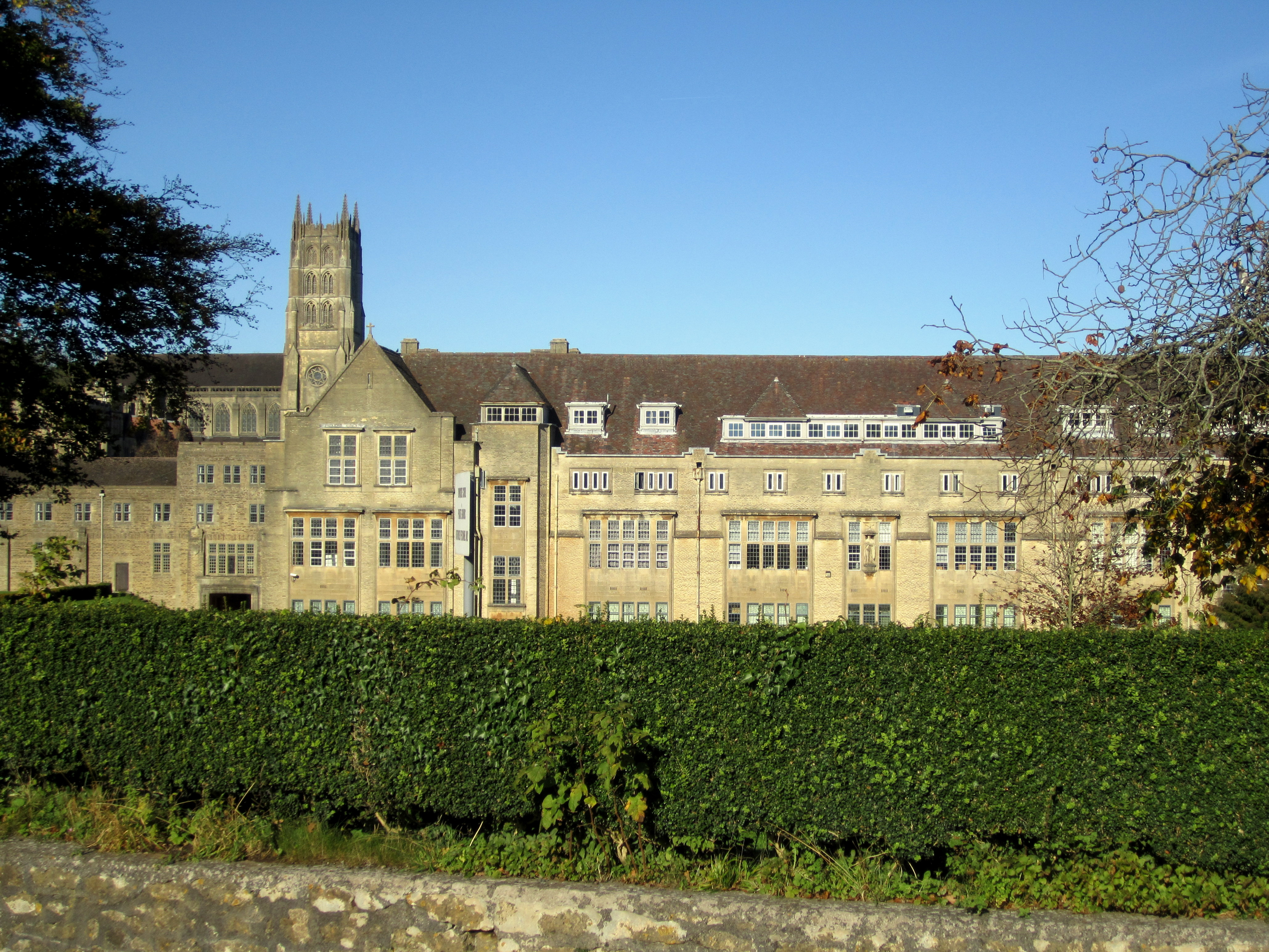

Location
- Stratton-on-the-Fosse, Somerset, BA3 4RJ; England; 51°15′18″N 2°29′42″W

Information
- Other name: Downside
- Type: Independent, day and boarding school
- Motto: Latin: Apud bonos iura pietatis (Amongst good people, there are rules of piety [worth more than riches] Justinus, or Among the Good, Piety is the Law)
- Religious affiliations: Catholic Church (English Benedictines until 2019)
- Established: 1614; 412 years ago
- Founders: English Benedictine Monks in exile
- Local authority: Somerset Council
- Oversight: Diocese of Clifton
- Department for Education URN: 123910 Tables
- Head Master: Michael Randall
- Gender: Mixed
- Age range: 11–18
- Enrolment: 249 (2026)
- Capacity: 420
- Houses: Barlow; Caverel; Isabella; Roberts; Smythe; Powell
- Colours: Maroon and gold
- Publication: Downside Diary; Tessera; The Raven; The Rook; The Old Gregorian
- Alumni: Old Gregorians ("OGs")
- Website: www.downside.co.uk

Listed Building – Grade II*
- Designated: 1 June 1961
- Reference no.: 1295086

Downside School (formally The College of St Gregory the Great, Downside, simply referred to as Downside) is a mixed, Catholic public school in Stratton-on-the-Fosse, Somerset, England. It was established in 1614 and is located in the Diocese of Clifton.

Originally a school for English Catholic boys, it was established by English and Welsh monks living in exile at Douai, France. The monastic community returned to England in 1795, with both the community and its school initially housed in the Shropshire home of Sir Edward Smythe, a former pupil. By 1814, the abbey and school had been re-established at their present site, in Somerset. Downside School became fully co-educational in all year groups in 2005.

== History ==
Monks from the monastery of St Gregory's, Douai in the County of Flanders, came to Downside in 1814. In 1606, St Gregory's was the first house after the English Reformation to begin convent life with a handful of exiled Englishmen. For nearly 200 years, St Gregory's trained monks for the English mission and six of those men were beatified by Pope Pius XI in 1929. Two of the monks, Saints John Roberts and Ambrose Barlow, were among the Forty Martyrs of England and Wales canonised by Pope Paul VI in 1970.

Imprisoned then driven from France following the Revolution, the community remained at Acton Burnell in Shropshire for twenty years before finally settling in Somerset in 1814. New school buildings were built there, designed by Henry Goodridge. The monastery was completed in 1876 and the Abbey Church in 1925, and raised to the rank of a minor basilica by Pope Pius XI in 1935 . Attached to the monastery, the school provides a Catholic boarding education for boys and girls between the ages of 11 and 18. During the 19th century, Downside remained a small monastic school. Dom Leander Ramsay founded the modern Downside and planned the new buildings, designed by Leonard Stokes, that opened in 1912 and now form two sides of the "Quad".

The 20th century brought about changes for Downside, with the expansion of the school buildings and the school population, numbering over 600 boys during the 1960s. Over the decades, the number of pupils fell, but with development drives and renewed demand for boarding education, pupil numbers rose. Girls were admitted from 2005. Since the opening of Isabella House in 2007, approximately 60% of the pupils are boys and 40% are girls.

In 2003, the school was the setting for the Channel 4 television show, A Second Chance, in which Ryan Bell, a teenager from London, was sent to the school to see if a "difficult" student would do better when educated in the independent sector. After excelling at Latin, biology, and on the rugby field, Bell was eventually expelled after being caught drinking.

== Structure ==
=== Governance ===
Downside is run by lay staff and a board of governors consisting of a chairman and ten others. Of the latter, one is a member of the Benedictine community. In 2019 the school and the abbey became separate trusts. The Abbey proving difficult to maintain, the remaining monks moved to Buckfast Abbey.

=== House system ===
The school has a house system consisting of six houses: five senior houses and one junior house, with both day pupils and boarders in the same houses. Each house takes its name from the community's martyrs or benefactors:

- Powell House although in the senior school is a Junior House for all boys in Third Form before they join their senior house in Fourth Form. It is named after the martyr Blessed Philip Powell, a monk of St Gregory's at Douai.
- Barlow House (Boys) is situated on the south side of the main quad. It is named after the martyr Ambrose Barlow who was also a monk of St Gregory's at Douai. The house colours are black and white.
- Caverel House (Girls) was formerly a boys' house but was re-furbished and changed to a girls' house following the admission of girls to Downside in September 2005. Caverel is named after the benefactor Abbot Philippe de Caverel. The house colours are green and white.
- Isabella House (Girls) was founded in 2007 as a second girls' house in the senior school. The house is situated in a purpose-built building in the south-east of the school grounds. The house is named after a benefactor, Infanta Isabella Clara Eugenia of Spain and Portugal. The house colours are gold and blue.
- Roberts House (Boys) is situated in the north and west sides of the main quad. It is named after the martyr and monk of St. Gregory's in Douai, St. John Roberts. The house colours are red and white.
- Smythe House (Boys) is situated in the east side of the main quad, and is named after the major benefactor, Sir Edward Smythe. The house colours are yellow and black.

== Sports ==
Members of the school compete in a range of sports, including rugby, football, netball, hockey, cricket, golf, and tennis, and even the Downside Ball Game, a variation on Fives, played on a purpose-built outdoor court. Sports are played most afternoons, with every pupil expected to participate at least three times a week.

=== Cricket ground ===
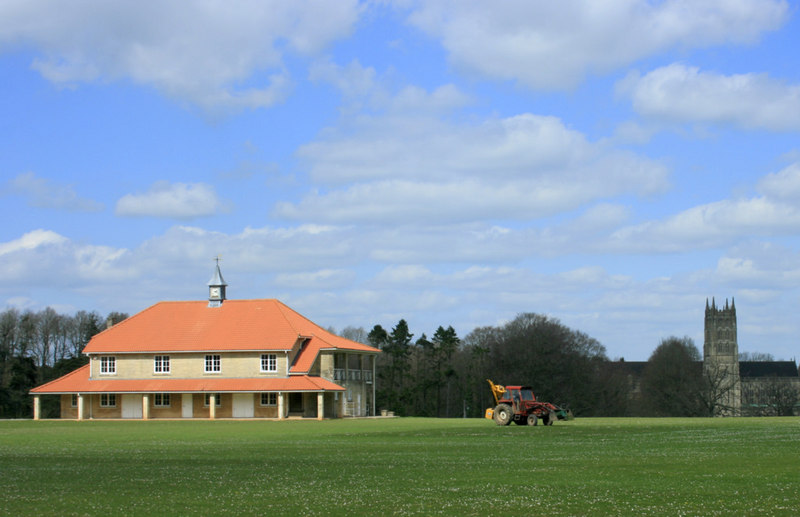
Image of the cricket pavilion in 2010.

The first recorded match on the school's cricket ground was in 1898, when the school played Lansdown. In 1930, the school hosted the Australian cricket team in its preparation for the Ashes, with the notable exception of Don Bradman. In 1934, the ground hosted a single first-class match between Somerset and Glamorgan.

== Air crashes ==
On Saturday 15 May 1943, during a cricket match between the school and an army team, two Hawker Hurricane fighter aircraft appeared over the playing fields at around 3 pm. They circled the fields, performing manoeuvres as they did so; an eyewitness describing them "diving over the field and banking steeply". In what would be the final pass, at around 3:20 pm, both aircraft flew across the cricket ground at an extremely low altitude and climbed rapidly to clear the tall fir trees bordering the field. The second aircraft appeared to clip the trees with its tail and nose-dived straight into the ground, crashing and bouncing, the burning debris finally coming to rest among the schoolboys watching the cricket match from an embankment. The pilot and nine people on the ground were killed, with 15 others injured, ten of them seriously.

In September 2013, a Socata TB-10 light aircraft crashed in the school grounds, causing the death of its pilot, the sole occupant. Witnesses reported that it sounded as if the plane was doing aerobatics before it crashed.

== Filming location ==
In 2000, principal photography for the psychological thriller The Hole, directed by Nick Hamm and based on the 1993 novel After the Hole by Guy Burt, took place at the school.

More recently, the school was used as the location for the TV series Gone, starring Eve Myles and David Morrissey. Filming took place over the Easter 2025 school holiday, and some pupils appeared as extras.

== List of modern headmasters ==
Before 1894, the prior also served as head of the school however after 1894, the position was created and named 'Rector' but was this was altered in 1900 to became known as 'Headmaster'.

- Dom Wilfred New (1894–1900)
- Dom Adian Howlett (1900–1902)
- Dom Leander Ramsay (1902–1918)
- Dom Sigebert Trafford (1918–1934)
- Dom Anselm Rutherford (1934–1939)
- Dom Christopher Butler (1939-1946)
- Dom Wilfred Passmore (1946-1962)
- Dom Aelred Watkin (1962-1975)
- Dom Raphael Appleby (1975-1980)
- Dom Philip Jebb (1980-1991)
- Dom Aidan Bellenger (1991-1995)
- Dom Antony Sutch (1995-2003)
- Dom Leo Maidlow-Davis (2003-2014)
- James Whitehead (2014-2017)
- Andrew Hobbs (2017-2025)
- Michael Randall (2025-)

== Sexual abuse inquiry ==
Following investigation into the English Benedictine Congregation, including Downside School, the Independent Inquiry into Child Sexual Abuse (IICSA) published a report in August 2018. Ten people connected to the Benedictine schools, mostly monks, were convicted or accepted a caution for abuse. The report said that appalling abuse was inflicted on pupils over a period of forty years, but the schools had tried to cover up the allegations. The chair of the inquiry, Alexis Jay, said that for decades the schools tried to avoid giving information to police or authorities, with monks being "secretive, evasive and suspicious of anyone outside the English Benedictine Congregation", prioritising "the reputation of the Church and the well-being of the abusive monks" over safeguarding the interests of pupils. In 2001, after new procedures were introduced following the Church's Nolan Report, which recommended that abuse should be referred to the statutory authorities, monks gave the appearance of co-operation and trust, but in reality continued to cover up abuse. A statement on the school's website in 2018 embraced the findings of the Social Care Institute of Excellence (SCIE) audit, completed in March 2018, and released a revised and stringent Child Protection Policy. Andrew Hobbs, formerly the acting head, and designated safeguarding lead during the audits and the Independent Inquiry into Child Sexual Abuse (IICSA), was appointed headmaster of Downside in September 2018.

At that time, the school did not have a separate legal status from the abbey, so the monastic trustees had financial and executive control of the school. The governors provided general direction and management.

In May 2020 it was revealed that in the time following the release of the 2018 IICSA report regarding abuse at Downside School, the school had had financial problems due to spiralling legal costs, and, to raise money, had been forced to sell some Renaissance paintings.

== Notable alumni ==
Alumni are known as Old Gregorians, after St Gregory, the School's Patron Saint.

== Notable staff ==
- Augustine Bradshaw (1575–1618), founder of the College of St Gregory
- Richard Terry, director of music, 1890s
- Illtyd Trethowan, Classics master 1936 to 1982
- Harry Lee, cricket coach 1949 to 1953
- Robert Blackburn, master in 1950s
- Ewan Anderson, master in 1960s
- Ralph Prouton, sports master, 1960s to 1990s
- John Crockett, art and drama master, 1969 to 1976
- Aidan Bellenger, headmaster 1991 to 1995, later Abbot of Downside
- Jon Callard, sports master in 1990s
- Alfonso Thomas, housemaster, 2016–2019
