= Lamspringe (Samtgemeinde) =

Coordinates: 51.967°N 10.017°E

Lamspringe is a former Samtgemeinde ("collective municipality") in the district of Hildesheim, in Lower Saxony, Germany. Its seat was in the village Lamspringe. On 1 November 2016 it was dissolved.

The Samtgemeinde Lamspringe consisted of the following municipalities:

1. Harbarnsen
2. Lamspringe
3. Neuhof
4. Sehlem
5. Woltershausen
