= Alban Roe =

English Catholic saint

Saint Alban Roe O.S.B
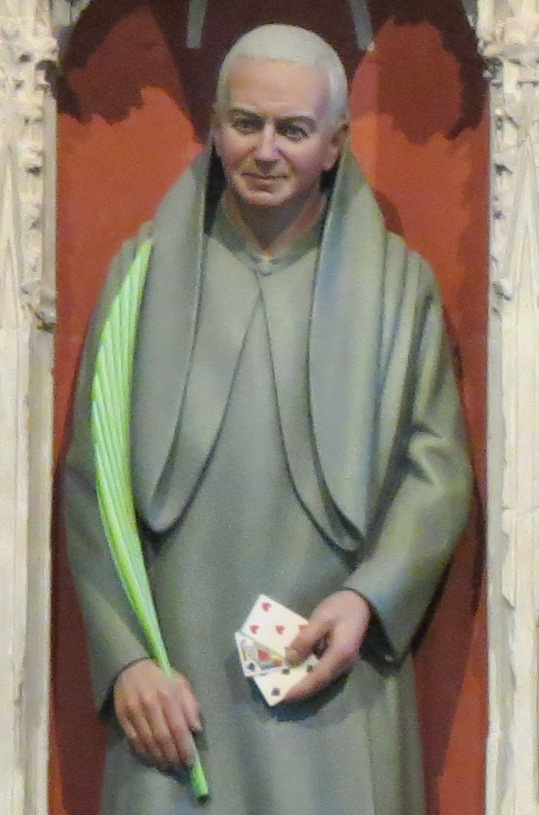
- Sculpture in St Albans Cathedral, depicted holding a hand of playing cards

Priest and Martyr
- Born: 20 July 1583; Bury St. Edmunds, Suffolk, England
- Died: 21 January 1642 (aged 58); Tyburn, London, England
- Venerated in: Catholic Church
- Beatified: 15 December 1929, Rome by Pope Pius XI
- Canonized: 25 October 1970, Rome by Pope Paul VI
- Feast: 21 January and 25 October
- Attributes: Benedictine habit, heart in hand, noose around neck, martyr's palm, playing cards
- Patronage: Ampleforth Abbey

Alban Roe (born Bartholomew; 20 July 1583 – 21 January 1642) was an English Benedictine who was killed for ministering as a Catholic priest in 17th-century England. He is venerated as one of the Forty Martyrs of England and Wales.

== Early life ==
Bartholomew Roe was born in 1583, in Suffolk. He was brought up a Protestant and with his brother James converted to Catholicism; both became Benedictine monks.

Details of Roe's life are scant. He was not typically monastic, but of an explosive and unpredictable temperament. It has been said that the outstanding characteristics of his life were cheerfulness and tenacity, and that his sanctity was unquestionable.

The disruption caused by the dissolution of the monasteries deprived Benedictine monks of a key aspect of their life: lifelong stability within a community. Large monasteries had disappeared and those houses which remained consisted of small fragmented groups or even isolated individuals. Inevitably for monks at this time, this type of community led some to focus on contemplation, becoming withdrawn mystics whilst others out of necessity were more practical and individual, and focussed on the missionary aspect.

== Conversion ==
Roe's conversion experience was unusual: he tried to convert an imprisoned Catholic to Protestantism, but found himself defeated in argument. From this time, according to Challoner, "Mr. Roe was very uneasy in mind upon the score of religion; nor did this uneasiness cease till by reading and confessing with Catholic Priests he was thoroughly convinced of his errors and determined to embrace the ancient faith. Having found the treasure of God's truth himself, he was very desirous to impart the same to the souls of his neighbours." Consequently, in 1607 he entered the English College at Douai to study for the priesthood.

Roe was not only content to rub people up the wrong way, but to make sure that they noticed. When the Prior had some cupboards removed from near to his bed, Roe declared: "There is more trouble with a few fools than with all the wise; if you pull down, I will build up; if you destroy, I will rebuild."

He was expelled from the college in 1610 due his temperament, records stating that "we consider the said Bartholomew Roe is not at all fitted for the purposes of this College on account of his contempt for the discipline and for his superiors and of his misleading certain youths living in the College and also of the great danger of his still leading others astray, and therefore we adjudge that he must be dismissed from the College."

Roe did not leave quietly, but used his considerable skills to organise a campaign against the authorities. A significant body of monks seem to have seen him as some sort of hero and backed his appeal to the President. This allowed him later in 1613 to join the English Benedictine Priory of St Laurence at Dieulouard in Lorraine (today Ampleforth Abbey), being ordained in 1615. There is no record of him being at all troublesome at Dieulouard. He became a founder member of the new English Benedictine Priory of St Edmund's, Paris, (today's Douai Abbey) hence his religious name Alban of St. Edmund.

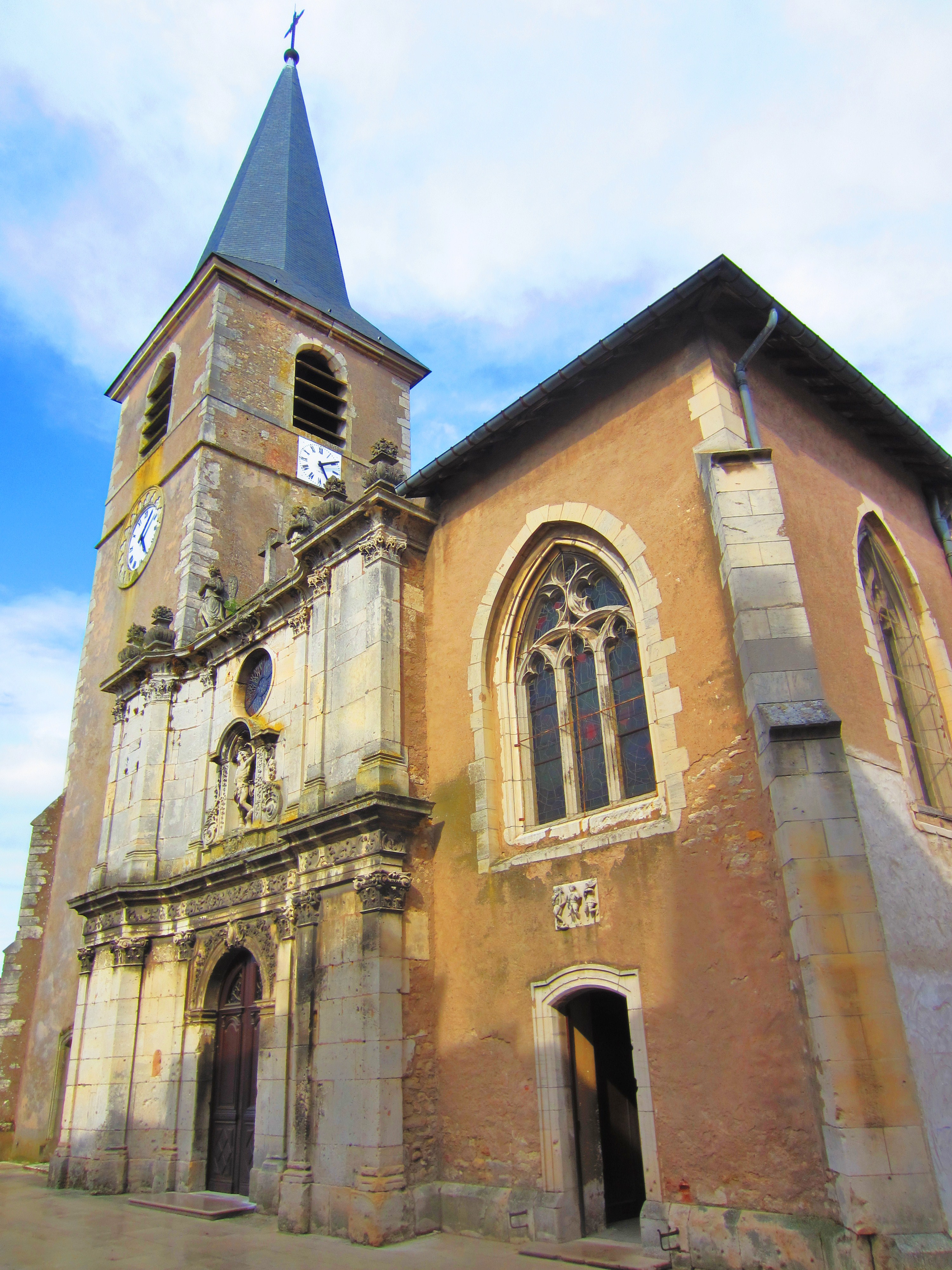
The English Benedictine Priory of St. Laurence, Dieulouard

== Ministry and arrest ==
Roe was professed in 1612 and after ordination in 1615 joined the missions and worked in London, being arrested and deported shortly after his arrival.

He returned in 1618 and was imprisoned until 1623, whereby his release and re-exile was organised by the Spanish ambassador, Gondomar. He returned two years later and was incarcerated for 17 years in the Fleet prison. Conditions in the Fleet were relaxed and he was able to minister to souls during the day provided he was back in his cell at night. He was zealous for the conversion of souls and lacking a church could be found in ale houses playing cards with the customers. This was permitted under the Constitutions of the English Benedictine Congregation at the time; the stakes were not monetary, but short prayers. Of course, this behaviour scandalised the Puritans, but as he was already a prisoner, there was little more they could do against him. He was also allowed to receive visitors in prison where in addition to strengthening his resolve through private prayer he taught visitors prayers and made many converts. Richard Challoner notes him translating "several pious tracts into English, some of which he caused to be published in print, others he left behind him in manuscript."

== Trial ==
In 1641 he was transferred to close confinement within the strict Newgate prison. In his trial in 1642 he was found guilty of treason under the Jesuits, etc. Act 1584 for being a priest.

Challoner details his initial refusal to enter a plea. It then transpired that the chief witness against him was a fallen Catholic who he had formerly helped. Thinking he could win him round again, he pleaded not guilty, but objected to being tried by "twelve ignorant jurymen", who were unconcerned about the shedding of his innocent blood. The judge was intimidated by Roe making a mockery of the proceedings, and took him aside for a private conversation. This went badly with, Roe declaring "My Saviour has suffered far more for me than all that; and I am willing to suffer the worst of torments for his sake." The judge sent him back to prison where he was advised by who Challoner describes as "some grave and learned priests" to follow the example of those before him and consent to being tried by the court. The jury took about a minute to find him guilty. He then, in mockery, bowed low to the judge and the whole bench for granting him this great favour which he greatly desired.

The judge suspended the sentence and sent him back to prison for a few days. Roe's fame led to a constant stream of visitors, one of whom smuggled in the necessary items for him to say mass in his cell.

== Martyrdom ==
On the morning of 21 January 1642, Roe together with fellow priest Thomas Reynolds was drawn on hurdles from Newgate Prison to the place of execution. At Tyburn, Roe preached in a jovial fashion to the crowd about the meaning of his death. He was still playing to the crowd, holding up the proceedings by asking the Sheriff whether he could save his life by turning Protestant. The Sheriff agreed. Roe then turned to the crowd declaring "see then what the crime is for which I am to die and whether religion be not my only treason?"

His remark to one of his former gaolers was "My friend, I find that thou art a prophet; thou hast told me often I should be hanged."

He created quite an impression by his death and when his remains were quartered there was a scramble to dip handkerchiefs into his blood and pick up straws covered in his blood as relics. The speech he made is said to have been sent to Parliament and stored in their archives.

== Canonisation ==
Roe was declared venerable in December 1929 by Pope Pius XI and beatified one week later on 15 December. Roe was canonized nearly 40 years later on 25 October 1970 by Pope Paul VI as one of the Forty Martyrs of England and Wales with a common feast day of 25 October. His feast day is also celebrated on 21 January, the day of his martyrdom.

The communities of St. Laurence and St. Edmund returned to England at the end of the 18th century, during the upheavals of the French revolution. St. Laurence settled in Yorkshire at what was to become Ampleforth Abbey. St. Edmund settled at Douai Abbey, Reading.

== Namesake in the United States ==
St. Alban Roe Catholic Church was founded in 1980 in the city of Wildwood, Missouri. It is located off of highway 109. It includes a small parochial school of the same name, which is supported by the Catholic Archdiocese of St. Louis.
