= Edward Mayhew =

Edward Mayhew (1569 – 14 September 1625) was an English Benedictine.

== Life ==
Mayhew belonged to the recusant family of Mayhew or Mayow of Winton, near Salisbury, Wiltshire. On 10 July 1583, he entered with his elder brother Henry, the English College at Rheims, where he displayed conspicuous talents, and received the tonsure and minor orders on 22 August 1590. Moving to Rome, he there continued his studies until his ordination, after which he left for the English mission in 1595.

Having served for twelve years on the mission as a secular priest, he joined the Benedictine Order. He was professed by Sigebert Buckley, the sole survivor of the English congregation, in his cell at the Gatehouse prison, Westminster, on 21 November 1607, with Robert Sadler.

Under these two new members the English Benedictine Congregation began to revive. Becoming affiliated with the Spanish congregation in 1612, it was given an equal share in St Lawrence's monastery at Dieulwart, Lorraine, henceforth the centre of the English congregation. Retiring from the English mission in 1613, Mayhew took up his residence at Dieulwart, where he filled the office of prior from 1613 to 1620.

The union of the three congregations engaged on the English missions had for some time been canvassed, in 1617 Mayhew was appointed one of the nine definitors to bring this about. That of the English and Spanish congregations was accomplished by the Apostolic Brief, "Ex incumbenti", of August 1619, but the members of the Italian congregation refused to become united.

From 1623 until his death he acted as vicar to the nuns at Cambrai. His remains lie in the parish church at St-Vedast.

== Works ==
The most important of Mayhew's works are:

- Sacra Institutio Baptizandi etc. (Douai, 1604);
- Treatise on the Groundes of the Olde and Newe Religion etc. (s. l., 1608);
- Congregationis Anglicanae Ordinis S. Benedicti Trophaea (2 vols., Reims, 1619, 1625).
