= English Benedictine Congregation =

Group of Benedictine abbeys

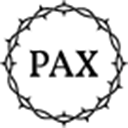
- Abbreviation: Post-nominal letters O.S.B.
- Nickname: EBC
- Formation: 1216
- Type: Benedictines
- Headquarters: England
- Region served: Australia, Ireland, Peru, Sweden, UK, United States, Zimbabwe
- Members: 19 monastic communities; 268 monks and nuns (2022 figures)
- Abbot President: Dom Robert Igo, O.S.B.
- Parent organization: Roman Catholic Church; Order of St Benedict; Benedictine Confederation
- Website: www.benedictines.org.uk

The English Benedictine Congregation (EBC) is a congregation of autonomous abbatial and prioral monastic communities of Catholic Benedictine monks, nuns, and lay oblates. It is technically the oldest of the nineteen congregations affiliated to the Benedictine Confederation.

== History ==
The English Benedictine Congregation was erected by the Holy See in 1216 as a means of uniting the great ancient English Benedictine abbeys under a common framework and held its first General Chapter in Oxford in 1218. The roots of English Benedictine monasticism, however, go back much further and can be dated to the arrival of Augustine of Canterbury and the communities established by Wilfrid and Benedict Biscop in the 6th and 7th centuries. As such, the Benedictines are the oldest surviving religious order in the British Isles, were crucial in the conversion of the people to Christianity, and have strongly affected the character of English Christianity, even its Protestant forms.

From 1534 to 1540, all of the congregation's houses were violently suppressed during Henry VIII's Dissolution. The congregation as it exists today is the result of Pope Paul V's 1619 unification of two groups of English Benedictines, a group of continental houses for exiles founded in the early 17th century and a group of about 8 monks who had been aggregated in 1607 to the ancient English Congregation by Dom Sigebert Buckley, the last surviving monk of Westminster Abbey.

=== Pre-dissolution Congregation ===
The pre-dissolution communities of England were the product of the 10th-century English Benedictine Reform of Dunstan and the monastic principles laid down in the Regularis Concordia. They could claim a material continuity with the first English Benedictine communities founded by Augustine and his companions in the Gregorian mission of the 6th century; and the many great Anglo Saxon Benedictine saints and foundations such as Ethelreda and Sexburga of Ely Abbey, Erkenwald of Chertsey Abbey, Ethelburga of Barking Abbey, and Mildred of Minster in Thanet Priory. The congregation also claimed a moral continuity with Benedict Biscop, Wilfrid, Bede, and their communities in spite of the material link being broken by the Viking invasions.

The 13th-century congregation and the ancient traditions of English Benedictine life completely ceased to exist at the dissolution of the monasteries under King Henry VIII 1535–1540. Like all the professed monastic, canonical, and mendicant religious at the time of the Henrician dissolution, English Benedictine priests or scholars were assumed into the reformed secular clergy of the Church of England if they assented to the Supremacy. Other priests, lay brethren, and nuns of the congregation were pensioned off if aged, sought lay employment or marriage accepting effective laicisation, were left to vagrancy, or went into exile in the Abbeys of continental Europe if they wished to maintain conventual observances, or lived as covert eremites in England. A relative few were martyred, with some monks tortured to death by being Hanged, drawn and quartered, some in such provocative locations as their own Abbeys and associated holy sites, or in the place where common criminals were executed on their abbatial estates. These included three beatified abbots and the brethren of their communities who died with them; the last Abbot of Glastonbury Richard Whiting, executed on The Tor with fellow Glastonbury monks John Thorne, and Roger James; the last Abbot of Reading Hugh Faringdon, executed in the inner courtyard of his Abbey with fellow Reading monks John Eynon, and John Rugg; and the last Abbot of Colchester John Beche, executed in a common hanging place on his monastic lands.

=== Post-dissolution Congregation ===
Mary I briefly restored Westminster Abbey to 14 English Benedictine monks, professed either in pre-dissolution or continental houses, under Abbot John Feckenham of Evesham Abbey on the feast of the Presentation of Mary (21 November) in 1556, and they admitted a small number of new brethren to profession. This very modest revival was again suppressed on 12 July 1560 under the Elizabethan Religious Settlement.

During the reigns of Elizabeth I and James I, English exiles with monastic vocations joined houses of the Cassinese Congregation in France, Spain, and Italy. The present congregation was established by English Catholic expatriates in France and the Low Countries at the start of the 17th century and encouraged by the Holy See.

==== Formal reestablishment ====
As more rampant persecution emerged in reprisal to the 1605 Gunpowder Plot, the last of the Westminster monks professed under Abbot Feckenham, the aged Dom Sigebert Buckley O.S.B, feared the congregation would die with him. He "aggregated" Doms Robert Sadler and Edward Mayhew O.S.B, two English monks, priests, and missionaries of the Abbey of Santa Giustina, Padua, and four other lay brothers and oblates to the near-extinct Chapter of Westminster (and thereby the English Benedictine Congregation) on 21 November 1607. The Deed of Aggregation was an unofficial, clandestine affair, treasonable under English law and without prior papal consent, with only Buckley, Sadler, and Mayhew personally present. The Deed was later ratified by Pope Paul V in the papal brief Cum Sicut Accepimus (24 December 1612).

In 1619 the 4 extant male Priories of exiled English-speaking monks (Douai English priory, forerunner to the Downside, Ealing, and Worth communities; Dieulouard English Priory, forerunner to the Ampleforth community; St Edmunds Priory Paris, forerunner to the Douai community; and the extinct Priory of Saint-Malo) were united by another brief of Paul V, Ex Incumbenti. The documents issued in Paul's papacy were further ratified by a bull issued 12 July 1633 by Pope Urban VIII, titled Plantata.

The EBC's claim of continuity thus depends entirely on the 1607 Deed of Aggregation and the briefs of 1612 and 1619, not on any direct line of continuity with regular conventual English Benedictine life prior to the Dissolution. The present congregation owes its original spiritual identity primarily to the Spanish Cassinese communities its monks were formed in, the dangerous situation of persecution, the need for priestly and catechetical workers in the English mission, and the general climate of Tridentine monastic reform.

==== English Benedictine houses in exile ====
In 1598 Lady Mary Percy O.S.B established the first religious community for English exiles under the Rule of St Benedict for nuns at Brussels, from which sprang a number of daughter houses, which together with the mother house returned to England during the French Revolution. These communities were the Brussels mother house, later East Bergholt Abbey; the Ghent community, later Oulton Abbey, founded 1624; the Dunkirk community, later Teignmouth Abbey, founded 1662; and the Ypres community, Kylemore Abbey, founded 1665. The Abbeys of the Percy tradition remained unaffiliated from any Benedictine congregation including the EBC until Kylemore aggregated in 2020. But Dames from the Brussels and Ghent were involved of the 1623 EBC convent at Cambrai.

In 1607 a Priory dedicated to St Gregory the Great, the first monastic community for exiled English Benedictine monks (ancestor of Downside Abbey and its daughter houses Ealing Abbey and Worth Abbey), was established at Douai in Flanders by John Roberts and other English monks from Spanish monasteries, particularly the Royal Abbey of San Benito, Valladolid. In 1608 another community (ancestor of Ampleforth Abbey) was established in the disused collegiate church of Dieulouard, dedicated to St Laurence of Rome, in the Duchy of Lorraine (modern France). Two further houses in the Kingdom of France followed, the first in 1611 at Saint-Malo in Brittany, and the second in 1615 in Paris, founded by Dom Gabriel Gifford O.S.B (ancestor of today's Douai Abbey) as a daughter house of St Laurence Priory, Dieulouard dedicated to St Edmund the Martyr King. In 1632 the Paris community settled on the Rue Saint-Jacques, where King James II was later buried in the Chapel of St Edmund. The final community for monks was established in a disused collegiate church dedicated to St Adrian and St Denis, Lamspringe Abbey (ancestor of Fort Augustus Abbey), in Upper Saxony in what is now Germany.

The missionary work of the EBC monks among the recusant Catholics in England began to attract more women to the monastic life. Eight postulants travelled to Flanders with Dom Benet Jones, led by Gertrude More, great-great-granddaughter to St Thomas More, and settling near Douai. The community was established in 1623 at Cambrai and dedicated to Our Lady of Consolation (ancestor of Stanbrook Abbey). By 1645 the Cambrai community under Abbess Catherine Gascoigne had increased to 50 nuns, and was living in conditions of extreme poverty. On 6 February 1652, a new priory was established in Paris dedicated to Our Lady of Good Hope with Dame Bridget More as Prioress (ancestor of Colwich Abbey).

== Sexual abuse scandal ==
The sexual abuse scandal in the EBC around the turn of the 21st century was a significant episode in a series of Catholic sex abuse cases in the United Kingdom. The events concerned ranged from the 1960s to the 2010s, and led to a number of EBC monks being laicized, convicted and imprisoned for the sexual abuse of children and vulnerable adults.

== Structure and membership ==
Every four years the General Chapter of the EBC elects an Abbot or Abbess President from among the ruling and former ruling abbots and abbesses of the houses of the congregation. He or she is assisted by a number of officials, and periodically undertakes a Visitation of the individual houses. The purpose of the Visitation is the preservation, strengthening and renewal of the religious life, including the laws of the Church and the Constitutions of the congregation. The President may require by Acts of Visitation, that particular points in the Rule, the Constitutions and the law of the Church be observed.

The current Abbot President is Abbot Christopher Jamison, former Abbot of Worth Abbey.

In 2020 the EBC had houses in the United Kingdom, the United States, Peru, and Zimbabwe. In 2022, three communities of nuns – Kylemore Abbey (Ireland), Mariavall Abbey (Sweden) and Jamberoo Abbey (Australia) – were accepted into the EBC, bringing the number of houses and communities to 17.

Membership Numbers

In 2022, membership of the constituent houses was as follows.

House	Bishops	Monks	Nuns	Novices
Downside Abbey	0	14	0	0
Ampleforth Abbey	0	45	0	0
Douai Abbey	0	21	0	0
Stanbrook Abbey	0	0	23	0
Belmont Abbey	1	27	0	4
Curzon Park Abbey	0	0	5	0
Ealing Abbey	0	9	0	0
Buckfast Abbey	0	8	0	0
Saint Anselm's Abbey	0	12	0	1
Worth Abbey	0	19	0	0
Portsmouth Abbey	0	12	0	0
Saint Louis Abbey	0	21	0	0
Kylemore Abbey	0	0	12	0
Jamberoo Abbey	0	0	22	0
Mariavall Abbey	0	0	12	0
Total	1	188	74	5

== Houses ==
=== Houses of the Congregation in exile ===
Religious house in Europe	Location	Dates	Successor house in England
St Gregory's Priory, Douai	Douai, France	1607–1798	Downside Abbey
Dieulouard Priory	France	1608–1798	Ampleforth Abbey
St Malo Priory	St Malo, Brittany	c.1610 – late 17th century	n/a
St Edmund's Priory, Paris; later St Edmund's Abbey, Douai	Paris	1615–1798 (Paris); 1818–1903 (Douai)	Douai Abbey, Woolhampton
Cambrai Priory	Cambrai, Flanders	1625–1794	Stanbrook Abbey
Our Lady of Good Hope Priory, Paris	Paris	1651–1794	Colwich Abbey
Lamspringe Abbey	Lamspringe, Lower Saxony	1630–1803	Broadway Priory, 1826–34; Fort Augustus Abbey, 1886–1998

=== Houses of the present Congregation ===
England

- Ampleforth Abbey in North Yorkshire (monks), fdd 1608 in Dieulouard, France
- Belmont Abbey in Herefordshire (monks), fdd 1859
- Buckfast Abbey in Devon (monks), fdd 1882, aggregated to the EBC 1960
- Curzon Park Abbey in Cheshire (nuns), fdd 1868 as an Anglican community, aggregated to the EBC 1921
- Douai Abbey in Berkshire (monks), fdd 1615 in Paris
- Downside Abbey in Somerset (monks), fdd 1607 in Douai
- Ealing Abbey in London (monks), fdd 1897 by Downside monks
- Stanbrook Abbey in Wass, North Yorkshire (nuns), fdd 1625 in Cambrai
- Worth Abbey in West Sussex (monks), fdd 1933 by Downside monks

Australia

- Jamberoo Abbey (nuns), fdd 1849 in Rydalmere, aggregated to the EBC 2020

Ireland

- Kylemore Abbey (nuns), fdd 1665 in Ypres, aggregated to the EBC 2020

Peru

- Priory of the Incarnation (monks), fdd 1981 in Tambogrande, from 2006 in Pachacamac and from May 2018 transferred to Lurín, in the buildings of the former Cistercian nunnery, daughter house of Belmont

Sweden

- Mariavall Abbey (nuns), fdd 1957 as a Lutheran community, aggregated to the EBC 2020

United States

- Portsmouth Abbey in Rhode Island (monks), fdd 1918 by Downside Abbey
- Saint Louis Abbey in St. Louis County, Missouri (monks), fdd 1955 by Ampleforth Abbey
- Saint Anselm's Abbey in Washington, D.C. (monks), fdd 1923 by Fort Augustus Abbey

Zimbabwe

- Monastery of Christ the Word (monks), fdd 1996, daughter house of Ampleforth

=== Defunct houses of the present Congregation ===
- Colwich Abbey in Staffordshire (nuns), fdd 1651 in Paris; merged with Stanbrook Abbey and closed in 2020
- Atherstone Priory in Warwickshire, fdd 1859 by the nuns of Colwich and closed in 1966
- Fort Augustus Abbey in the Scottish Highlands (monks), fdd 1630 at Lamspringe: merged with Ampleforth Abbey and closed in 1998

== Notable English Benedictines ==
=== Reformation martyrs ===
- Saint John Roberts O.S.B. Monk, priest, missionary, and martyr. First prior of Priory of St Gregory the Great, Douai. Born at Trawsfynydd in Gwynedd Wales c 1577. Professed as a monk at the Monastery of San Martiño Pinario in Santiago de Compostela, late 1600. Martyred at Tyburn 10 December 1610 (aged 32 – 33). Feast(s) 10 December, 25 October.
- Saint Ambrose Barlow O.S.B. Monk, priest, missionary, and martyr. Born at Barlow Hall, Chorlton-cum-Hardy, Lancashire c 1585. Professed a monk at Priory of St Gregory the Great, Douai in 1615–17. Martyred at Lancaster 10 September 1641 (aged 55–56). Feast(s) 10 September, 25 October.
- Saint Alban Roe O.S.B. Monk, priest, missionary, and martyr. Founder member of Priory of St Edmund, Paris. Born at Bury St Edmunds in Suffolk on 20 July 1583. Professed a monk at Priory of St Laurence, Dieulouard in 1613. Martyred at Tyburn 21 Jan 1642 (aged 58). Feast(s) 21 January, 25 October.
- Blessed Mark Barkworth O.S.B. Oblate, priest, missionary, and martyr. Born 1572 at Searby, Lincolnshire. Professed as an Oblate in the Royal Abbey of St Mary of Irache in Navarre. Martyred at Tyburn with Saint Anne Line and Blessed Roger Filcock S.J, on 27 February 1601 (aged 28 – 29). Feast 27 February.
- Blessed George Gervase O.S.B. Monk, priest, missionary, and martyr. Born 1569 at Bosham in Sussex. Was kidnapped by pirates and enslaved in the Caribbean in youth. Monastic profession at Priory of St Gregory the Great, Douai in the early 1600s. Martyred for the offence of being a priest at Tyburn 11 April 1608 (aged 37 – 39). Feast 11 April.
- Blessed Maurus Scott O.S.B. Monk, priest, missionary, and martyr. Born c. 1579 at Chigwell, in Essex. Professed a monk probably at Abbey of San Facundo in Castile and León between 1604 and 1610. An eyewitness of the martyrdom of John Roberts (martyr) in 1610. Martyred alongside Blessed Richard Newport at Tyburn 30 May 1612 (aged 32–34). Feast 30 May.
- Blessed Philip Powell O.S.B. Born on the 2 February 1594 at Trallong in Brecknockshire, Wales. Professed a monk at Priory of St Gregory the Great, Douai. Martyred 30 June 1646 (aged 52) at Tyburn. Feast day 30 June
- Blessed Thomas Pickering O.S.B. Born c. 1621 in Westmorland. Professed a monk at Priory of St Gregory the Great, Douai in 1690. Martyred 9 May 1679 at Tyburn (aged 57). Feast day 9 May.
