= Lamspringe Abbey =

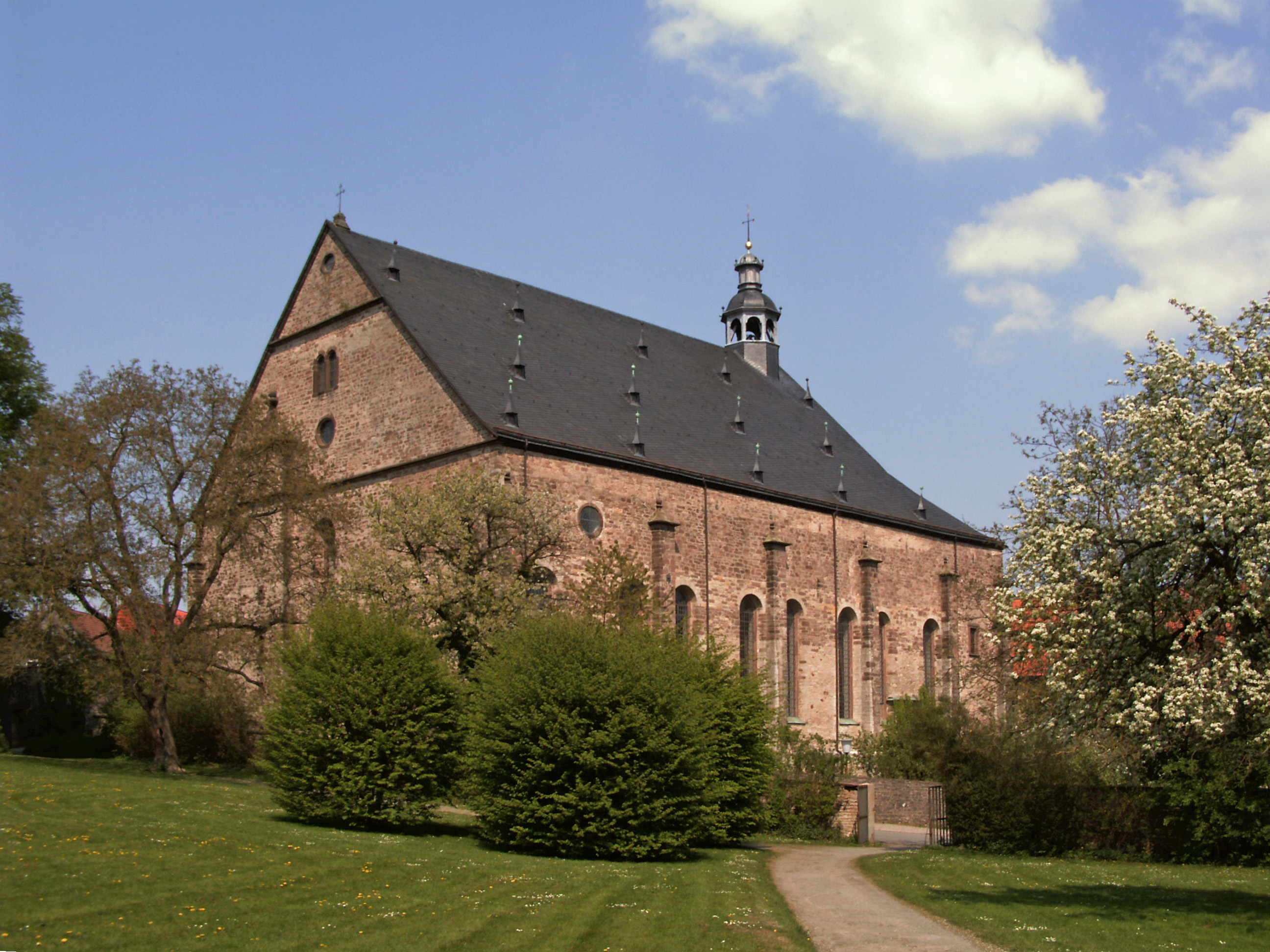

- Location within Lower Saxony

Monastery information
- Full name: Lamspringe Abbey
- Order: Canonesses Regular; Benedictine
- Established: 847; 1630
- Dedication: St Adrian of Corinth & St. Denis
- Controlled churches: Lamspringe Abbey

Site
- Location: Lamspringe, Hildesheim, Germany
- Coordinates: 51.95°N 10°E
- Other information: The relics of St Oliver Plunkett and the head of St Thomas of Hereford.

Lamspringe Abbey (Stift Lamspringe, later Kloster Lamspringe) is a former religious house of the English Benedictines in exile, at Lamspringe near Hildesheim in Germany.

== First foundation ==
The foundation by Count Ricdag of the first religious house at Lamspringe for Augustinian canonesses is conventionally dated around 850. It was founded by a Count Riddagus, whose daughter, Richburga, became the first abbess. Lamspringe became a reformed Benedictine convent just before 1130. The convent received generous support from the bishops of Hildesheim, and became one of the wealthiest in the diocese during the 14th century. The priory became Lutheran in 1571 during the Reformation, but Catholics regained it in 1629. Little remains of the early medieval buildings.

== Second foundation ==
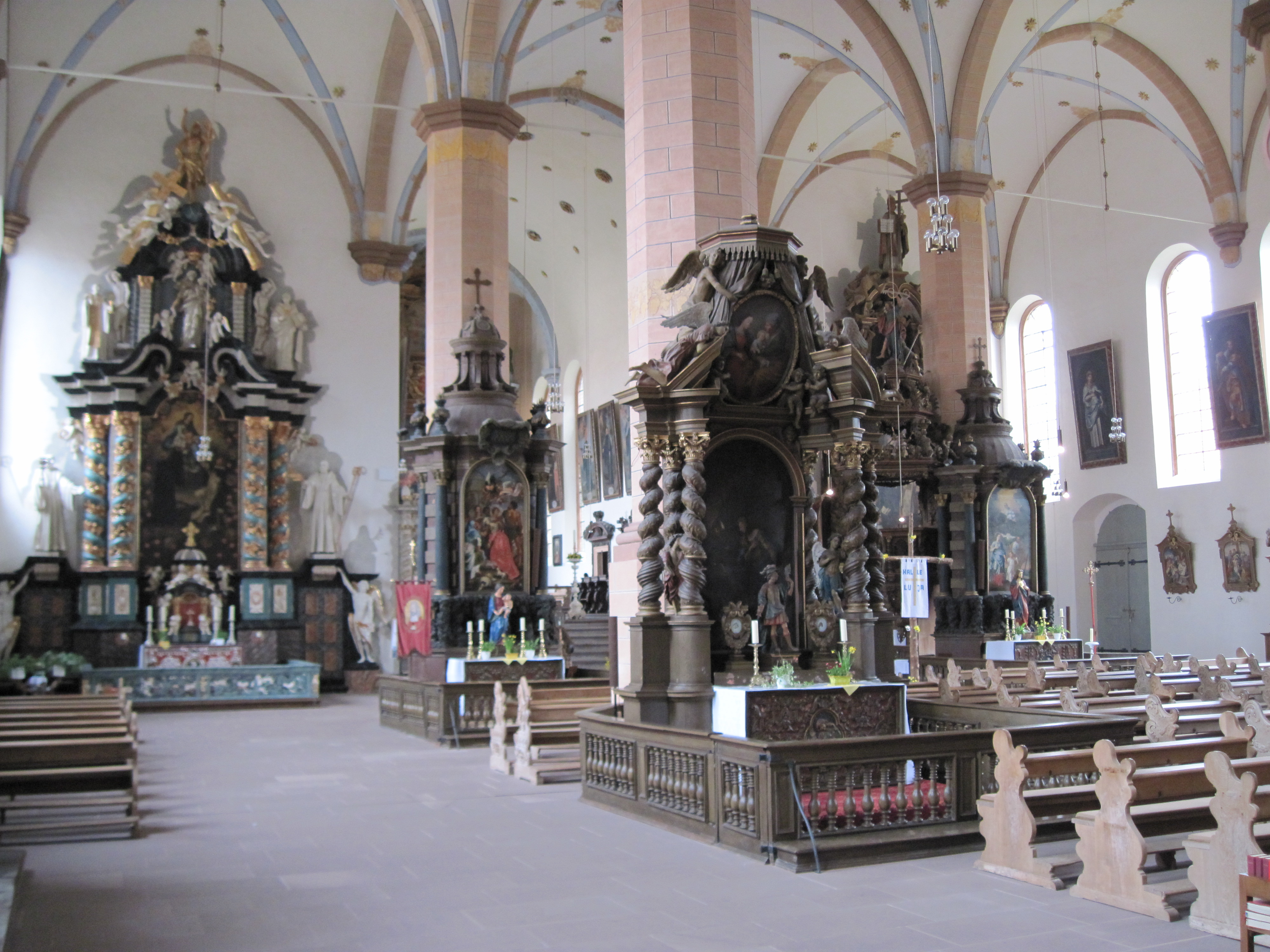
The former abbey church, now the parish church

In 1628 English Benedictine monks in exile approached the Bursfelde Congregation with a request for a conventual building and in 1630 were granted the derelict buildings at Lamspringe. However, they were unable to take possession and begin work on the monastery until the early 1640s, after the end of the Thirty Years' War. The English Benedictines rebuilt the abbey, dedicated to St Adrian of Corinth, a 3rd-century martyr, and St. Denis.

Lamspringe Abbey was the only English Benedictine Congregation abbey of the English Benedictines in exile. From 1671 they ran a good though small school for English Catholic boys, mostly from Yorkshire and the north, necessitated by England's then anti-Catholic laws. English gentry families (primarily in the north) and German princes were generous supporters.

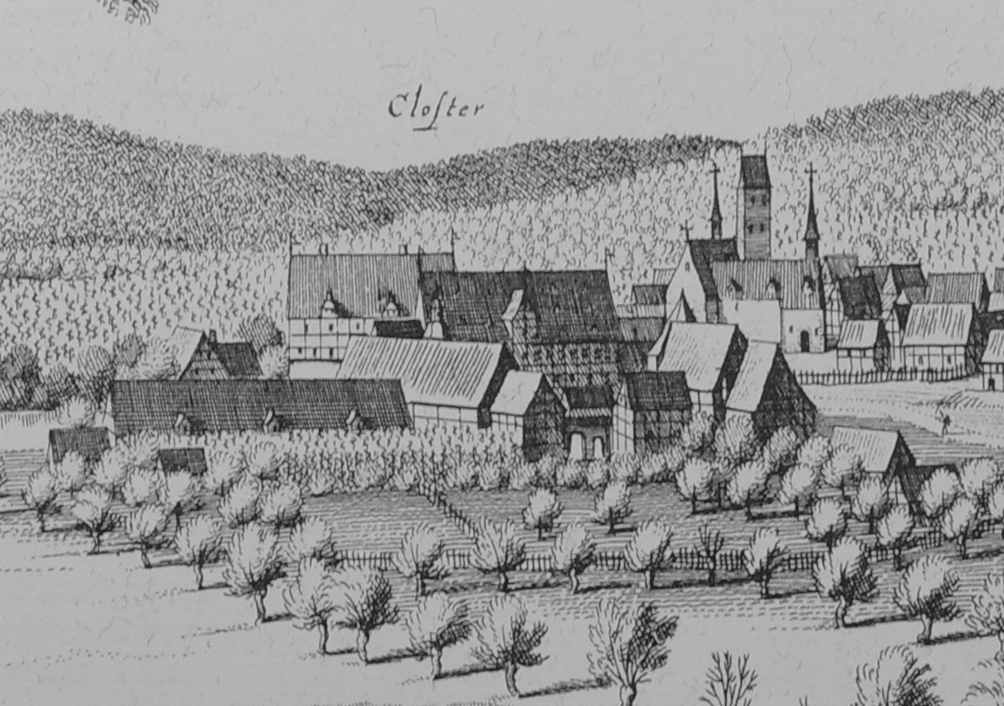
Kloster Lamspringe, 1653

Unlike the other English monasteries in exile, Lamspringe was a large abbey rather than a small priory, and was wealthy, with wide estates. The community's wealth and status were reflected in the quality of the building works undertaken. The abbey church, serious work on which began in 1691 under abbot Maurus Corker, and the remaining monastery buildings, executed in rather grand style by Yorkshireman abbot Joseph Rokeby up to 1731, still remain virtually intact.

Lamspringe Abbey housed the relics of St Oliver Plunkett, taken there in 1684 by the later Abbot of Lamspringe, Corker, who had been with him in Newgate Prison in London, as well as the head of St Thomas of Hereford. Plunkett's relics are now at Downside Abbey, along with a reliquary containing Hereford's skull and much of the monks' library. It is believed that it was via Lamspringe that Fr. Corker brought the Relic of the Head of St. Oliver to Rome and gave it to Oliver's old Dominican friend and correspondent, Philip Howard, Cardinal of Norfolk.

Lamspringe had 500 acres under direct cultivation, 3,500 acres of woodland, and extensive fishponds. The monastery brewery was established in 1717. The "Lamb's Spring" supplied water for the mill pond which supplied power to the monastery mill. From 1644 until 1802, 172 monks were professed, most came from northern England. There were regular visitations by the president of the English Congregation or his representative.

The abbey was secularised in 1803 by the Kingdom of Prussia, and the monks returned to England. The library was dispersed; it had contained as its most famous item the St. Albans Psalter, which is now at the basilica of St. Godehard, Hildesheim.

The school was transferred to the then newly established Ampleforth Abbey and formed the basis of the present Ampleforth College.

The monks, after a period of dispersal, reformed as a community at Broadway in Worcestershire between 1828 and 1841, after which they were spread among other houses, although the community was never formally disbanded. The last surviving members joined the abbey at Fort Augustus (1876-1998) at its foundation.

== Present day ==
The church still serves as the parish church, and the still impressive monastic buildings are put to a variety of parish and community uses. The abbey garden also survives and is one of the attractions of Lamspringe. Much of the monastery building now houses the local town council. The annual "St. Oliver Fest" in Lamspringe is held on the last Saturday of August.

== Abbots ==
- Clement Reyner 1645-1651
- Wilfrid Selby 1651-1657
- John Placid Gascoigne 1657-1681
- Joseph Sherwood 1681-1690
- Maurus Corker 1690-1695
- Maurus Knightley 1697-1708
- Joseph Rokeby 1730-1762
- Maurus Heatley 1762-1802

== Sources ==
- (in German) Lamspringe Municipality official website: History
- Douai Magazine No 166 - 2003: article on Lamspringe Abbey
- Cramer, A., OSB (ed.), 2004. Lamspringe: an English Abbey in Germany 1643-1803. Saint Laurence Papers VII, Ampleforth.
