= Finding Happiness =

2008 book by Christopher Jamison

- Author: Christopher Jamison
- Publisher: Orion Publishing Co
- Publication date: 2008

Finding Happiness: Monastic Steps for a Fulfilling Life is a 2008 book by Christopher Jamison. In the book Jamison discusses the modern error of equating external pleasures with happiness and argues that the interior world is the true source of happiness. Jamison challenges the reader to step back and be more contemplative, and to be still and look inwards. The teachings which Jamison presents are "based on those of the fourth-century Desert Fathers, founded by St Anthony and honed into shape by St Benedict, father of western monasticism".

Christopher Jamison is Abbot of Worth, a Benedictine abbey in West Sussex, who became well known through the BBC TV series The Monastery.
