= Sehlem =

Sehlem refers to the following places in Germany:

- Sehlem, Lower Saxony
- Sehlem, Rhineland-Palatinate
