= Clement Reyner =

English Benedictine monk

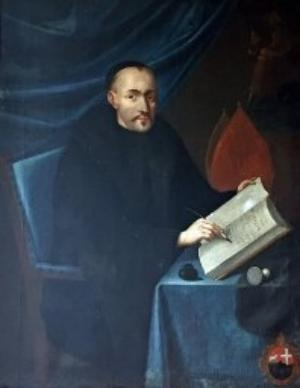
Abbot Clement Reyner O.S.B.

Clement Reyner D.D. (1589–1651) was an English Benedictine monk, who became abbot of Lamspringe in Germany.

== Life ==
Born Lawrence Reyner in Ripon, Yorkshire, he made his profession as a Benedictine monk in the monastery of St. Laurence at Dieulouard in Lorraine in 1610 taking the name in religion "Clement". He pursued his studies in St. Gregory's monastery at Douai. (His older brother Clement was also a Benedictine, taking the religious name "Lawrence".)

Subsequently, Reyner the younger was sent on the English mission, and was imprisoned in Yorkshire, as a Catholic priest, on 1 April 1618. On his release he returned to the continent and was graduated D.D. probably at Douai. He served as secretary to the president of his order from 1621 to 1629. Because he knew the language, he was sent as procurator to Germany to negotiate the transfer of monasteries from the Bursfelde Congregation. He effected the transfer of Cismar Abbey, Rinteln, and others. He was for half a year prior at Rinteln. the arrival of troops of the Protestant Gustavus Adolphus caused Reyner and his small community of monks to escape across the Weser river in mid-winter. Reyner proceeded to Douai to take his place at the General Chapter then in session.

The monks of monastery of St. Peter at Ghent requested an English Benedictine to suggest improvements in practice, Reyner was sent to introduce some reforms. He was subsequently president-general of his order from 1635 to 1641. At the ninth general chapter held in 1643 he was declared the first abbot of Lamspringe.

He died at St. Michaels' Monastery in Hildesheim on 17 March 1651. His remains were taken to Lamspringe in 1692, and buried in the church there.

== Works ==
Reyner was editor of the historical work Apostolatus Benedictinorum in Anglia, sive Disceptatio Historica de Antiquitate Ordinis Congregationisque Monachorum Nigrorum S. Benedicti in regno Angliæ, Douay, 1626. The materials for this work were collected by David Baker, and then his friend, John Jones, alias Leander à S. Martino, wrote up the materials into respectable latinity. In the dedication to Cardinal Bentivoglio, Reyner disclaimed authorship.

== Sources ==
- Augustine Baker, ed. Clement Reyner, Apostolatus Benedictinorum in Anglia (Laurentius Kellamus, Douai 1626). (Bayerische StaatsBibliothek digital) (in Latin)

Attribution

This article incorporates text from a publication now in the public domain: "Reyner, Clement". Dictionary of National Biography. London: Smith, Elder & Co. 1885–1900.
