= Sigebert Buckley =

English Benedictine monk

Sigebert Buckley O.S.B. (c. 1520 – probably 1610) was a Catholic Benedictine monk in England, regarded by the English Benedictine Congregation as representing the continuity of the community's tradition through the English Reformation.

Although the English Benedictines had been dissolved by Henry VIII in the 1530s, a solitary monastery was re-established at Westminster Abbey by the Catholic Queen, Mary I of England in 1556 under John Feckenham. The monks were again ejected under Elizabeth I in 1559. By 1607, only one of the Westminster monks was left alive: Father Sigebert Buckley.

Buckley survived until the reign of James I, by which time a number of Englishmen had become Benedictines in the monasteries of Italy and Spain and had obtained a faculty from Pope Clement VIII in 1602 to take part with the secular clergy and the Jesuits in the English mission. It was through the efforts of the English monks of the Cassinese or Italian Congregation (including Thomas Preston) that Buckley became instrumental in preserving monastic continuity in England. It is through Buckley that the English Benedictine Congregation lays claim to an unbroken continuity with the pre-Reformation monasticism of England.

The Benedictine Ampleforth Abbey and Ampleforth College, the largest Roman Catholic boarding school in England, traces its history through Buckley.

== Buckley's statement ==
I, D. Sebert, otherwise Sigebert, priest and monk of the monastery of St. Peter, Westminster, of the Congregation of England of the Order of St. Benedict: lest the rights, privileges, insignia, should perish which were formerly granted by Princes and Pontiffs and which for some years, God so permitting, have been preserved in me the sole survivor of all the English monks: did at London in the year 1607, the 21st day of November, with the consent of their superiors receive and admit as brethren and monks of the said monastery D. Robert Sadler of Peterborough and D. Edward Maihew of Salisbury, English priests and monks professed of the Cassinese Congregation of St. Justina of Padua: and to them did grant, impart and assign all rights, privileges, ranks, honours, liberties and graces which in times past the monks professed and dwelling in the said monastery did enjoy. And the same by these presents I do again approve, ratify and confirm. And I do receive and admit as monks, brethren, lay-brethren, oblates of the said monastery and to them do grant, impart and assign all rights, privileges, as above, all those whom D. Thomas Preston of Shropshire, D. Augustine [Smith] and D. Anselm [Beech] Lancastrians, and D. Maurus [Taylor] of Ely have admitted or received as monks, lay-brethren, oblates, and to whom they have granted the rights, &c, as above: since to them I did grant authority and power so to admit, &c, as appeareth more at large in my letters of the 21st November 1607: the which [letters] as to all and each of their parts I do by virtue of these presents hold ratified and confirmed, and will so hold them in perpetuum. Given at Punisholt, otherwise Ponshelt, Anno Domini 1609, the 8th day of November, in the presence of the underwritten Notary and witnesses".

== See also ==
- Woodlands, West Meon
