= Monastery of Christ the Word =

Religion
- Affiliation: English Benedictine Congregation
- District: Roman Catholic Archdiocese of Harare
- Status: Active

Location
- Location: Macheke, Zimbabwe

Website
- Official website

The Monastery of Christ the Word is a priory of the English Benedictine Congregation (EBC) located in Macheke, Zimbabwe, within the Roman Catholic Archdiocese of Harare. Founded in 1996, its community comprises some five monks.

== History ==
The monastery is a daughter house of Ampleforth Abbey, whose monks formed the community at the invitation of Archbishop of Harare Patrick Fani Chakaipa and the Zimbabwe Catholic Bishops' Conference, who were desirous of a monastic presence in their country. Although the idea of a monastery in Zimbabwe had already been conceived in 1992, the Monastery of Christ the Word was established only in 1996. The monastery was initially located in a two-storey building at Monte Cassino near Macheke that belonged to the Missionary Sisters of the Precious Blood.

== Main structure ==
The monastery has an altar made of wood, depicting four moments from the Last Supper, that was designed by the Art Workshop of the Driefontein Mission in Mvuma.

== Activities ==
The current prior is Robert Igo. According to Volume 116 of The Ampleforth Journal dated September 2011 to July 2012, the monastic community is made up of four other Ampleforth monks (Richard Ffield, Bamabas Pham, Joseph Dinala, and Placid Mavura) living according to the Rule of St. Benedict. The community rears its own livestock and their prior provides complimentary medical care to locals. The monastery also organises regular retreats that may last from days to a week.
