= Benet Perceval =

Dom Benet Perceval, OSB (1916 – 2009) was the oldest member of the monastic community at Ampleforth Abbey, England, when he died at age 92 on 30 January 2009.

== Life ==
He was born as Peter Perceval in Wimbledon in 1916. In 1926 he began studying at Ampleforth College. He took the name Benet in September 1934 when he joined the Ampleforth community. From 1937 to 1940 he studied at the University of Oxford. Besides the time he spent at the University of Oxford, he lived the entirety his life in North Yorkshire. Following his studies at Oxford he fulfilled a variety of roles in the monastery and school, including:

- Secretary to the Ampleforth War Memorial Trust Fund which provides bursaries for students to Ampleforth College (1945–2009).
- The first Housemaster of St John's House, a post he held until 1980.
- The college's Second Master until 1986.
- Prior of the Community from 1988.
- Served on the Abbey's Farm Board/Farm Committee which oversees work on Ampleforth's farmland.

== Family ==
He was a distant relation of Spencer Perceval, the only British Prime Minister to be assassinated (shot in the lobby of the House of Commons of the United Kingdom in May 1812).

== Posthumous tribute ==
Dom Benet's death was marked the same day by tolling the Abbey's bell, with 1 toll every 30 seconds for each year of his life.

== Sources ==
- Kelly, Liam (4 February 2009). "Ampleforth's oldest monk has died". Independent Catholic News.
- Jeffels, David (5 February 2009). "Tributes to Ampleforth Abbey's oldest monk, 92". Gazette & Herald (England). Archived from the original on 1 December 2017.
- "Ampleforth's oldest monk dies". The Northern Echo (England). 5 February 2009.
- "Death of Ampleforth's oldest monk". Easingwold Advertiser (England). February 2009. Archived from the original on 3 March 2016.
