= Worth Abbey =

English Benedictine monastic community

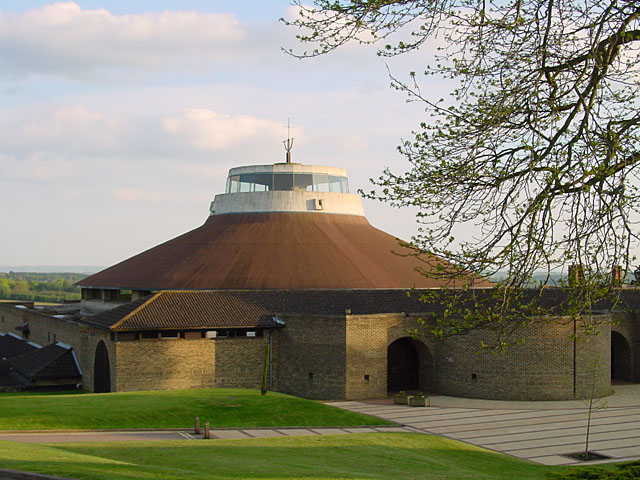

- Location within West Sussex

Monastery information
- Full name: Abbey of Our Lady, Help of Christians
- Other name: Worth Abbey
- Order: Benedictine
- Denomination: Roman Catholic
- Established: 1933
- Mother house: Downside Abbey, Stratton-on-the-Fosse, Somerset
- Dedication: Our Lady, Help of Christians
- Diocese: Arundel and Brighton

People
- Founder: Rt. Rev. John Chapman
- Abbot: Rt. Rev. Mark Barrett, O.S.B., Ph.D.
- Bishop: Rt. Rev. Richard Moth, D.D.

Architecture
- Functional status: Abbey
- Architect: Francis Pollen

Site
- Location: Paddockhurst Road, Turners Hill, Crawley, West Sussex, RH10 4SB
- Country: United Kingdom
- Coordinates: 51°5′33.16″N 0°7′5.94″W
- Grid reference: TQ318342
- Website: Worth Abbey

The Abbey of Our Lady, Help of Christians, commonly known as Worth Abbey, is a community of Roman Catholic monks who follow the Rule of St Benedict near Turners Hill village, in West Sussex, England. Founded in 1933, the abbey is part of the English Benedictine Congregation. As of 2020, the monastic community had 21 monks.

== History ==
Worth Abbey is a daughter house of the monastic community of Downside Abbey, in Somerset. The first monastic community of 17 monks was founded in September 1933 in the property formerly known as Paddockhurst, near Turners Hill village, by Abbot John Chapman of Downside. Worth was a dependent priory of Downside from 1933-1957. The conditions of sale of the property laid down that the name "Paddockhurst" should not be used by the new owners. Because the priory lay within the boundaries of Worth parish, the name "Worth" was chosen for the site. The first prior of Worth, Dom Anselm Rutherford, chose "Our Lady, Help of Christians", as the patron of the new monastery.

In 1957, the monastic foundation became an independent priory and its first prior was Dom Victor Farwell. In 1965, Worth was formally designated an abbey with Farwell elected as its first abbot. He remained as Superior until 1988, and was thus responsible for guiding the Worth community before, during, and after the period of the Second Vatican Council. In 1959, the community had already established a senior school now known as Worth School. In 1965, the community also began pastoral oversight of the parish of Worth. In 1968, a missionary connection with Peru began when monks from Worth built a farm and mission in the remote Apurimac valley, while in Lima they founded a monastery, a large parish and a health centre. Since 1990, the Worth community has no direct oversight in Peru, but the connection has been continued through the charity "Outreach Peru".

In 1971, the "Worth Abbey Lay Community" launched the idea of lay participation in monastic life for young people, growing to become, by 2003, an independent lay movement known as the "Lay Community of St Benedict". Between 1983 and 1990, St Peter's, East Dulwich, became the home to an experimental urban monastic community jointly founded by Worth Abbey and the Anglican Diocese of Southwark.

=== List of Abbots ===
1. Rt. Rev. Victor Farwell, O.S.B. (1965-1988)
2. Rt. Rev. Dominic Gaisford, O.S.B. (1988-1994)
3. Rt. Rev. Stephen Ortiger, O.S.B. (1994-2002)
4. Rt. Rev. Christopher Jamison, O.S.B. (2002-2010)
5. Rt. Rev. Kevin Taggart, O.S.B. (2010-2013)
6. Rt. Rev. Luke Jolly, O.S.B. (2013-2021)
7. Rt. Rev. Mark Barrett, O.S.B. (2021–present)

=== Abbey church ===
The abbey church (one part of the larger Worth Abbey complex of buildings) was built between the years 1964 and 1974 by the renowned English architect Francis Pollen who also designed adjoining buildings. It was dedicated to "Our Lady, Help of Christians", consecrated for worship in 1975, and is today a Grade II listed building of 17,000 square feet seating around 900 people. Being built for a monastic community to pray the communal Liturgy of the Hours, as well as a parish church for the local community, required a creative design. The original construction of a "church in the round" with a stone altar in the centre was considered common for that post Vatican II era, but unique in the architectural construction of churches in the larger UK. A general lack of funding delayed the construction and also required many original design features to be abandoned.

In 2011, the monastic community undertook a year-long renovation and refurbishment of the church led by the equally renowned English architect Thomas Heatherwick. The renovated church featured new lighting and a sound system that facilitated worship, along with newly constructed woodwork. The pews and monastic choir appointments were made of dark American walnut wood that also used distinctive ash wood embedded in the features.

=== Television documentaries ===
Worth Abbey was used for television programmes that have been described as a combination of "documentary" and "reality television". The first three-part series was broadcast in May 2005 by BBC Two broadcast and was entitled "The Monastery". Due to the success of the first series, a second series was broadcast in June 2006 and was entitled "The Monastery Revisited". A third series was then produced and broadcast in 2010 and was entitled "The Big Silence". The lead monk in these programmes was Abbot Christopher Jamison and he would produce a best-selling book series derived from these programmes called "Finding Sanctuary: Monastic steps for Everyday Life" and "Finding Happiness: Monastic Steps for a Fulfilling Life".

== Present ==
Like all Benedictine monks, the monks of Worth Abbey place the public prayer of the Church (the Opus Dei or Work of God) at the centre of their lives. In common with other monasteries of the English Benedictine Congregation, their tradition also places stress on daily periods of individual prayer and Lectio Divina (the prayerful reading of scripture). Through writing, preaching, and hospitality they make this tradition available to others.

Their retreat centre, through the "Open Cloister", offers daily, weekend, and weekly retreat programmes. There is a Quiet Garden on the grounds of the Abbey, which, like the Abbey Church, is open to the public.

== Gallery ==
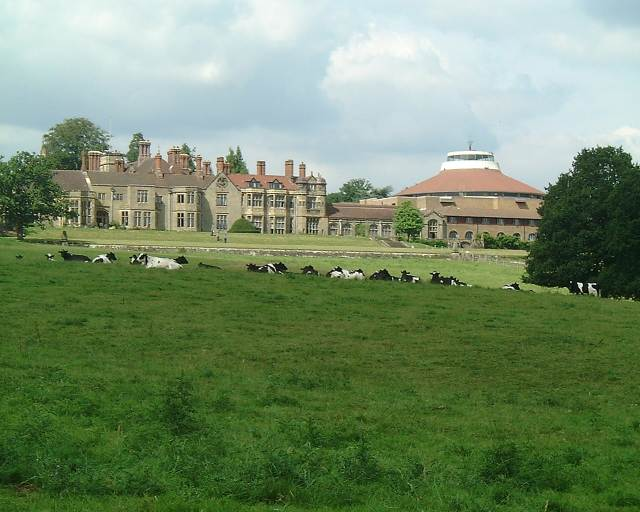

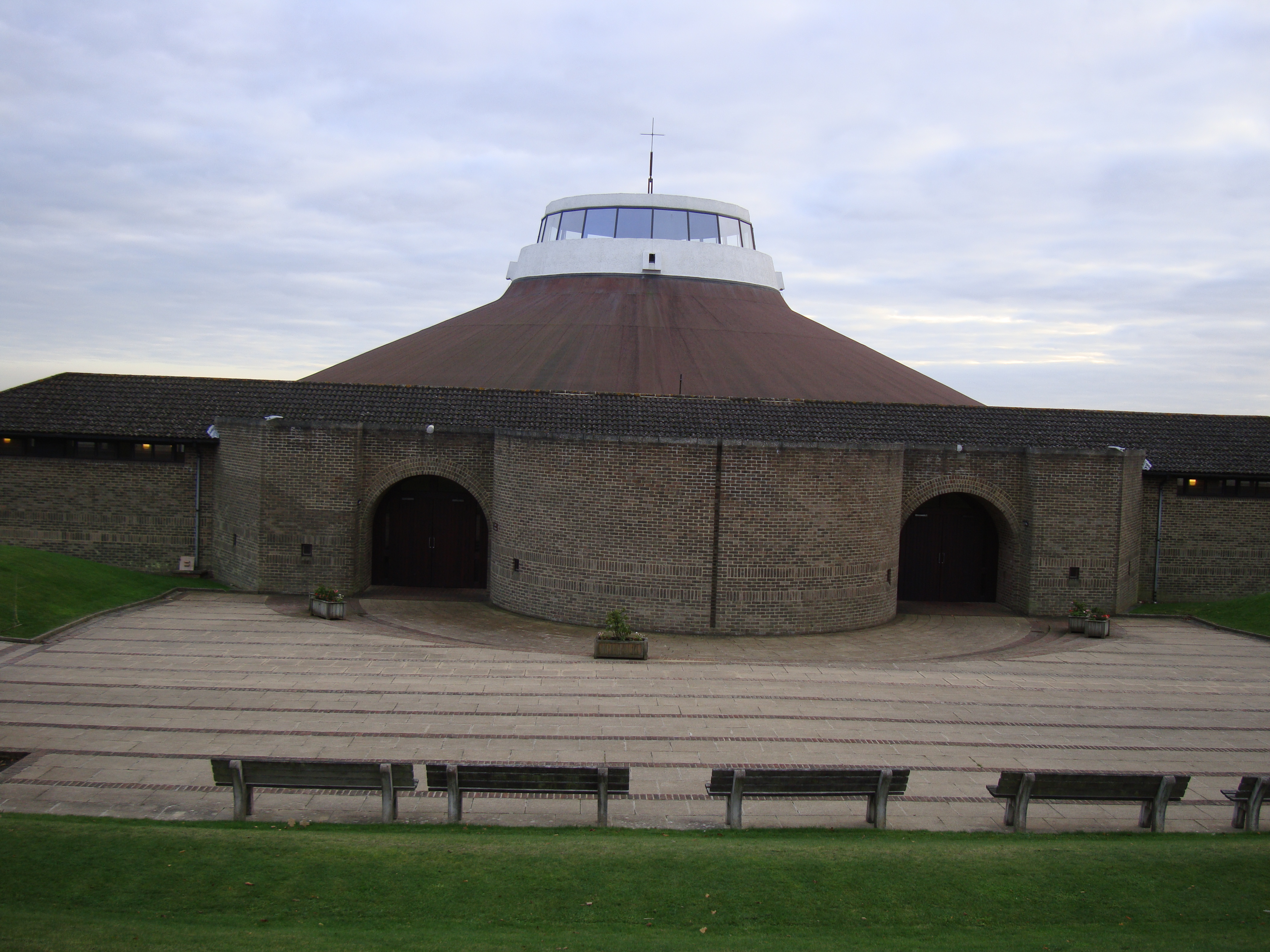

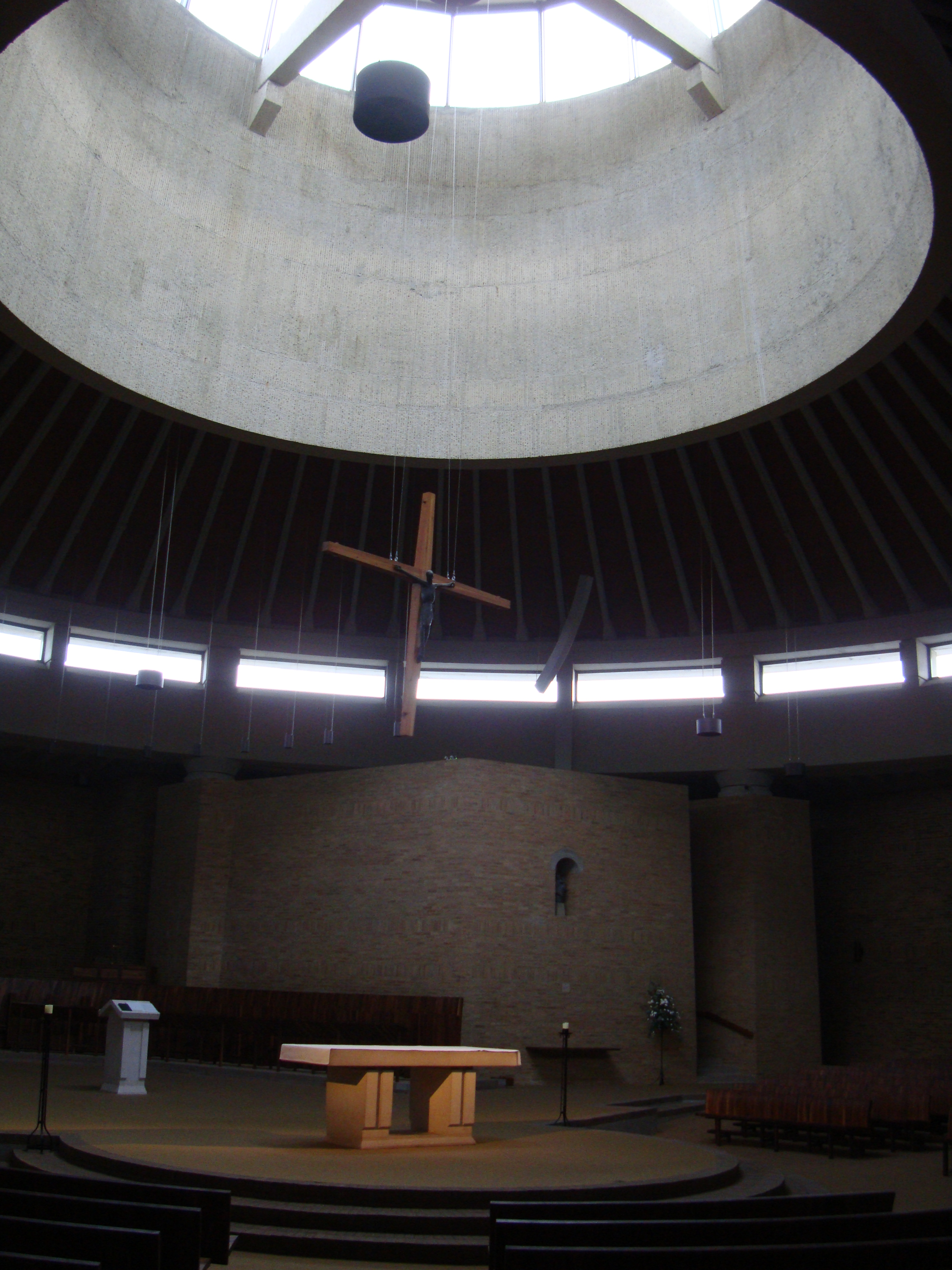

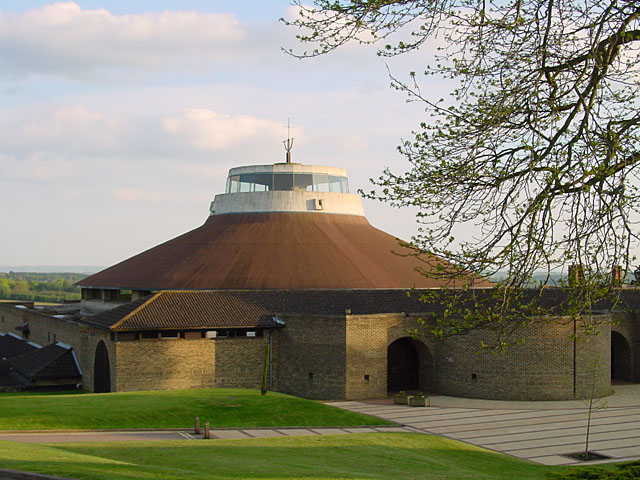

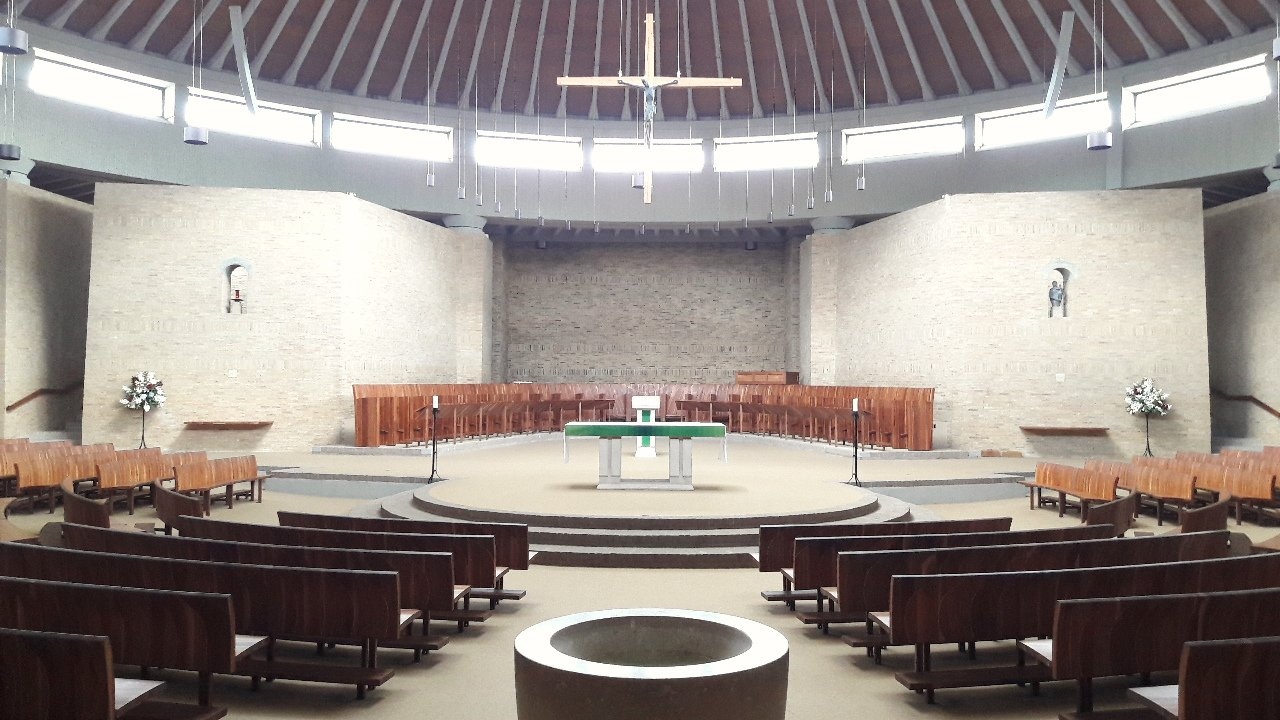

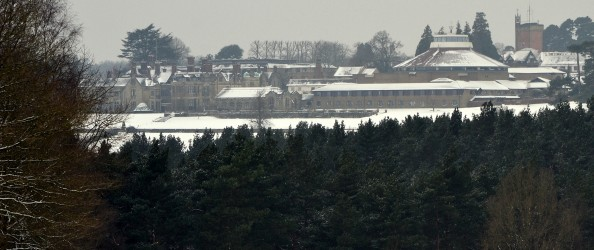
