= George Gervase =

English Benedictine priest

Blessed George Gervase OSB
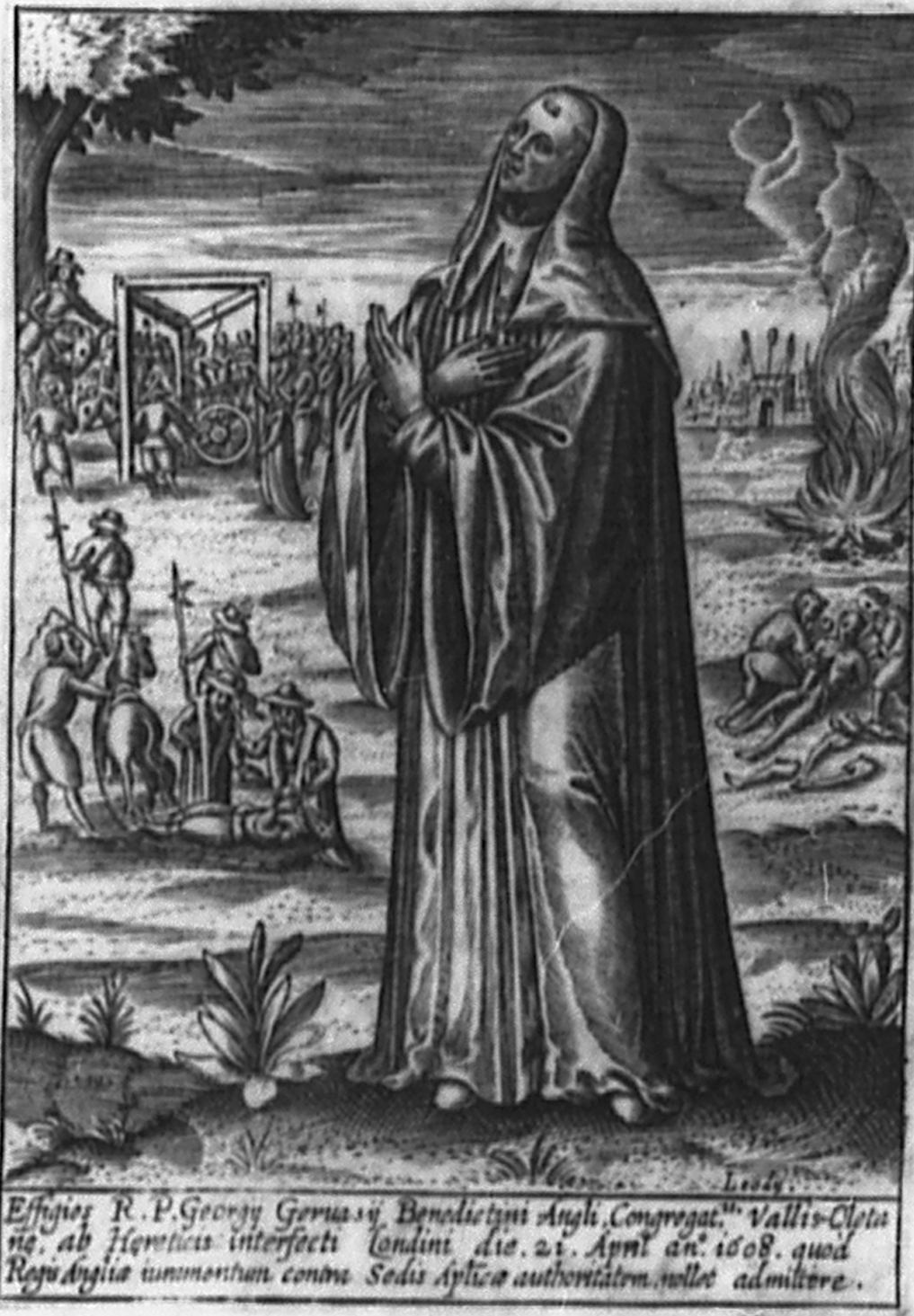
- George Gervase in Benedictine habit. In the background depictions of his martyrdom and his burial.

Martyr
- Born: c. 1569 – 1571; Bosham, Sussex, England
- Died: 11 April 1608 (aged 37–39); Tyburn, London, England
- Beatified: 15 December 1929 by Pope Pius XI
- Feast: 11 April

George Gervase OSB (1571 – 11 April 1608) was an English Catholic priest of the Order of St. Benedict who worked as a missionary in England during the period of recusancy. He was martyred at Tyburn.

== Life ==
George Gervase was born in Bosham, Sussex. He was left an orphan when he was twelve years of age, and soon after kidnapped by pirates, (probably a lieutenant of Drake, who was then buccaneering on the Spanish Main), and was taken to the West Indies with two of his brothers. He remained in captivity over twelve years. He lost his Catholic faith during that period; but, when at last he was able to return to England, and found that his eldest brother Henry had become a voluntary exile in Flanders in order to be able to practice his faith, George followed him there, and was soon reconciled with the Catholic Church.

After serving as a soldier in Flanders and with the Spanish army, he entered the English College at Douai in 1595, and was ordained priest in 1603. The following year, he went on the English mission, where he worked for over two years. He was arrested in June 1606, and banished with several other clergy.

He then made a pilgrimage to Rome, and there endeavoured to enter the Society of Jesus, but, not being admitted, he returned to Douai, where he was clothed as a novice at the English Benedictine Congregation monastery of St. Gregory’s (now at Downside Abbey). His brother Henry had obtained for him a comfortable living near Lille, being anxious to preserve him from the persecution then raging in England. But George was determined to labour for the conversion of his native land, and succeeded in returning to England. He was soon arrested and incarcerated. Refusing to take the new oath of allegiance on account of its infringing on spiritual matters where Catholics were concerned, he was tried, convicted of the offense of being a priest, and was hanged, drawn, and quartered at Tyburn.

He was beatified in 1929 by Pope Pius XI.

== See also ==
- Catholic Church in the United Kingdom
- Douai Martyrs
