= Christopher Jamison =

Australian monk, priest and writer

Dom Christopher Jamison OSB
- Abbot President of the English Benedictine Congregation
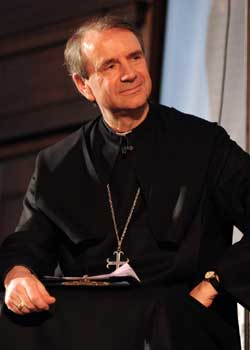
- Previous posts: Director of the National Office for Vocations for England & Wales; President of the International Conference on Benedictine Education; Abbot of Worth Abbey; Headmaster at Worth School; Teacher at Worth School

Orders
- Ordination: 29 June 1978

Personal details
- Born: 26 December 1951 (age 74) Melbourne, Australia
- Denomination: Roman Catholic
- Residence: England
- Occupation: Abbot President
- Profession: Benedictine Benedictine Monk & Priest
- Education: Oxford University

Christopher Jamison, O.S.B. (born 26 December 1951) is a Benedictine monk and former Abbot of Worth Abbey in West Sussex, England. He currently serves as the Abbot President of the English Benedictine Congregation.

== Early life ==
Jamison was born in Melbourne, Australia, in 1951 as one of four siblings whose family moved to Buckinghamshire, England, while he was a child. He went on to study at Downside School and later Oriel College at Oxford University where he attained an undergraduate degree and an M.A. in French and Spanish in 1973. He would later enter the monastic community of Worth Abbey where he would be sent to complete a B.A. at Heythrop College, University of London, in the field of Philosophy and Theology in preparation for ordination to the priesthood.

== Work ==
After ordination as a priest in 1978, Jamison began work as a member of the faculty of Worth School, a Roman Catholic independent school in West Sussex. In 1979 he was appointed Headmaster of Worth's Prep School. In 1994 he was appointed as Headmaster of the same Senior school and served until 2002. In 1993 he was also appointed by the Abbot Primate of the Benedictine Confederation to serve as President of the International Conference on Benedictine Education (ICBE) which facilitates dialogue between Benedictine secondary schools across the world. He served as both Headmaster of Worth School and President of the ICBE until 2002 when he was elected Abbot of Worth Abbey. He concluded one term as Abbot in 2010 at which time he was appointed as the Director of England and Wales' National Office for Vocations. He served in that role until 2017 when he was elected as the Abbot President of the English Benedictine Congregation where he serves to the present time.

== Media ==
Jamison came into wider public awareness after his appearance in 2005 in the BBC Two television documentary, The Monastery. The series charted the trials and tribulations of six men of varying levels of belief over a period of forty days and nights as they attempt to follow the monastic life. Thereafter he published two books related to that series: Finding Sanctuary: Monastic Steps for Everyday Life and Finding Happiness: Monastic Steps for a Fulfilling Life. He also served as an Advisor to the 'Future of Banking Commission' and 'New City Agenda', a "think tank" dedicated to improving ethical behavior in the financial services industry. During this time he published articles and gave talks on the subject of ethics of financial services. In 2010 he made the TV documentary The Big Silence, which followed several ordinary people as they explored the value and challenge of silent meditation. Often referred to as the "Media Monk", in his role as the Director of England and Wales' National Office for Vocations from 2010 to 2017, he appeared on BBC2, the Chris Evans Breakfast Show, gave lectures, and guested on numerous podcasts. In 2020 he partnered with the media production house CTVC and the youth charity 'Million Minutes' to produce 'Alone-Together', a web based online resource for people living through the COVID-19 crisis.

== Abuse Inquiries ==
In 2001, Jamison had been serving as the Headmaster at Worth School when a complaint was received against Father John Bolton who was a monk of Worth Abbey. Bolton had been accused of hugging a teenage student at the end of a meeting while alone in an office at Worth Abbey. While the investigation brought no formal charges, Bolton was suspended from Worth School. Jamison responded that "I followed the school's child protection procedures and immediately contacted the police child protection unit".

Upon his election as the Abbot President of the English Benedictine Congregation in 2017, Jamison was entrusted with the responsibility of trying to lead the Benedictines through a series of public inquiries related to the sexual abuse of minors within some abbeys and schools of the congregation. This process included his own testimony to the Independent Inquiry into Child Sexual Abuse (IICSA) to acknowledge previous failures in the congregation, offer unconditional apologies to victims, and outline a safe guarding and child protection plan of responsiveness, accountability, and transparency for all abbeys within the congregation. The Independent Inquiry into Child Sexual Abuse (IICSA) noted in their final report that "The recent extension of the role of the Abbot President of the EBC to have a supervisory role independent of visitations should provide some counterbalance to the authority of the abbot. Much now will depend on the leadership of the Abbot President".

In 2018, Abbot Cuthbert Madden, the Abbot of Ampleforth Abbey, brought civil action against Jamison as the Abbot President of the English Benedictine Congregation, and three other parties. Madden had previously been involved as a witness in the Independent Inquiry into Child Sexual Abuse (IICSA) related to his tenure as the Abbot of Ampleforth Abbey. Separate from this, Madden had been accused in 2016 of assaulting four boys and stepped aside as Abbot during the investigation. Madden denied wrongdoing of any kind. Investigations by police and church authorities occurred in 2016 and 2017 with a finding that the allegations lacked substantiation. A third ecclesiastical panel in 2018 recommended that Madden be reinstated "subject to conditions". Madden claimed Jamison interfered with the investigation and acted unlawfully against him. Madden further sought his own reinstatement as Abbot to Ampleforth Abbey. The Vatican then launched a separate investigation into the matter to determine if Madden could be returned as Abbot. A formal "visitation" to Ampleforth Abbey by two senior Benedictine monks then occurred on behalf of the Vatican. In the intervening time, the civil action by Madden against Jamison and the other three defendants was dismissed by the High Court in 2020 "on the grounds that it lacked any reasonable prospect of success and constituted an abuse of process". Madden was further ordered to pay the defendants' cost. The Vatican concluded its review and responded that it did not support Madden's request to return to Ampleforth Abbey. Fr. Gabriel Everitt, the abbey's prior administrator at the time, wrote of the Vatican's decision and said that while the Vatican recognized that Madden had "not committed any canonical delict nor been convicted of any civil crime", it "does not support Fr Cuthbert’s return to Ampleforth as Abbot or as a resident member of the community but wishes him to be free to live in a Benedictine community of his choice with the consent of the host Abbot". Jamison, as Abbot President, was entrusted with the responsibility of assisting Madden in finding a suitable Benedictine community for living, while also ensuring the election of a new Abbot for Ampleforth Abbey in 2021.

In 2019, an allegation of non-recent abuse was received against Jamison. In accordance with the English Benedictine Congregation safe guarding provisions, the police were informed and Jamison voluntarily stepped aside from his role as Abbot President while the matter was investigated. Subsequently, the police determined that there was no evidence to support the allegation and the statutory authorities allowed for Jamison to return to his duties. The Holy See restored Jamison to his role as Abbot President. Jamison responded that, "I welcome the opportunity to return to fulfilling my function as Abbot President, where I will continue in my work to improve safeguarding and redress across the EBC."

== Bibliography ==
- Christopher Jamison. Finding Sanctuary: Monastic Steps for Everyday Life. Phoenix; New Ed edition (1 March 2007). ISBN 978-0-7538-2149-7
- Christopher Jamison. Finding Happiness: Monastic Steps for a Fulfilling Life. W&N (16 October 2008). ISBN 978-0-297-85277-3
- Christopher Jamison. The Disciples' Call: Theologies of Vocation from Scripture to the Present Day. Bloomsbury T & T Clark (7 November 2013) ISBN 978-0567631770

Catholic Church titles
Preceded by Stephen Ortiger	Abbot of Worth Abbey; 2002–2010	Succeeded by Kevin Taggart
Preceded by Richard Yeo	Abbot President of English Benedictine Congregation; 2017–present	Succeeded by Incumbent
