= Woodlands, West Meon =

Hamlet in Hampshire, England

Woodlands is a hamlet in the parish of West Meon, Hampshire, England. It is a scattered settlement situated in the north of the parish, and contains various historic properties, including Punsholt Farm, the final resting place of Dom Sigebert Buckley, or the Last Monk of Westminster. The majority of the land forms part of Woodlands Farm, a private estate owned since 1945 by members of the Baring banking family.

Woodlands House, the principal residence of Woodlands Farm, was rebuilt following a disastrous fire in 2005.

== History ==
The hamlet formerly contained a school, public house, two chapels, a shop, and a bakery. The Three Horseshoes Public House closed in April 1903, it contained a shop, but this was closed by the mid-19th century. In the 1880s Woodlands became a part of the Basing Park Estate. At this time, a series of model farm buildings were built at Woodlands, replacing various farm buildings and cottages. An infants school had also been established by the 1890s, located in a now private residence known as School Cottage, it closed in the 1940s, with the Woodlands children then being sent to school at nearby West Meon.

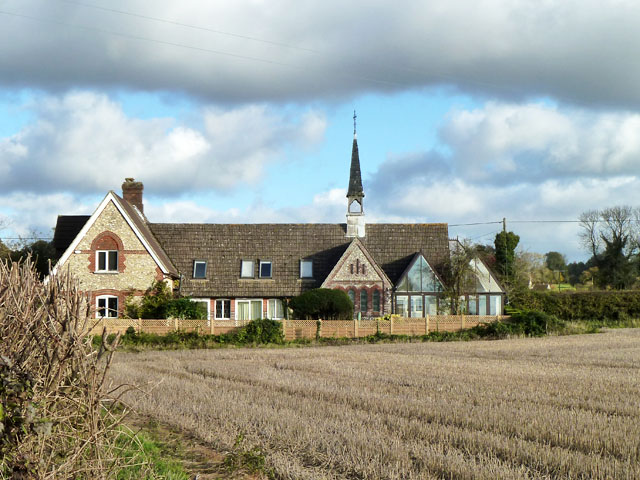
Former mission church

The former mission chapel, built in 1889, was erected by the Nicholson family of Basing Park. It closed in 1982, and is now a private dwelling. Punsholt Farm, to the north, is a predominantly 17th century farmhouse, and stands on or near the site of the former chapel of St Mary the Virgin, notable for being the final resting place of Dom Sigebert Buckley, a recusant, who died in 1610.

Prior to the 19th century, Woodlands was a much more sparsely scattered settlement than it is today. There were further dwellings on Kitts Lane, Filmore Hill Lane and Uncle Bills Lane. The area around School Cottage was then known as “Beards”. What is now known as Woodlands House (formerly Woodlands Farm) was known as Hatch Place.

In a Charter from 932, several place names and features are recorded at Woodlands, including: “Flax Lea, Herdsman’s Tree, Dyke, Small Wood”.

== Woodlands architecture ==
Woodlands is notable for its collection of Victorian estate buildings, the principal development of which took place in the 1880s at Upper House Farm. The Woodlands Mission Chapel was built at a prominent position on a crossroads, for the “convenience of the inhabitants residing at a distance from the parish church” at West Meon.

The Victorian buildings at Woodlands all formed a part of the Basing Park Estate, and are believed to have been designed by George Rackstraw Crickmay. A few other estate buildings were designed by Arthur Blomfield; however it is suspected that Blomfield did not have any involvement with any of the Woodlands buildings.

Many of the oldest buildings on the Basing Park Estate were demolished when the estate began to be properly established (eventually covering some 8,446 by 1909), however Woodlands still retains a number of much older structures, the oldest of which dates back to the 16th century. The former school house, known as School Cottage, whilst in the midst of the Upper House Farm development, dates back to the 17th century, and still retains its thatched roof and large central chimney stack. It is typical of the architecture which would have been found at Woodlands prior to the Victorian development.

Pursers, a country house overlooking Woodlands, is a former farmhouse turned mansion (since subdivided into three separate freehold properties), which was heavily altered in the early 1900s with works by Percy Richard Morley Horder.
