= Neuhof, Lower Saxony =

Neuhof
- Ortsteil of Lamspringe
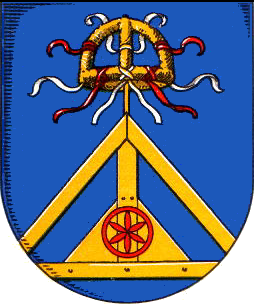
- Coat of arms
- Interactive map of Neuhof
- Location within Germany Location within Lower Saxony
- Coordinates: 51°59′N 10°03′E
- Country: Germany
- State: Lower Saxony
- District: Hildesheim
- Municipality: Lamspringe

Area
  - Total: 10.3 km^{2} (4.0 sq mi)
- Elevation: 216 m (709 ft)

Population (2015-12-31)
  - Total: 437
  - Density: 42.4/km^{2} (110/sq mi)
- Time zone: UTC+01:00 (CET)
  - Summer (DST): UTC+02:00 (CEST)
- Postal codes: 31195
- Dialling codes: 05183
- Vehicle registration: HI

Neuhof (German pronunciation: [ˈnɔʏhoːf]) is a village and a former municipality in the district of Hildesheim in Lower Saxony, Germany. Since 1 November 2016, it is part of the municipality Lamspringe.
