= Harbarnsen =

- Ortsteil of Lamspringe
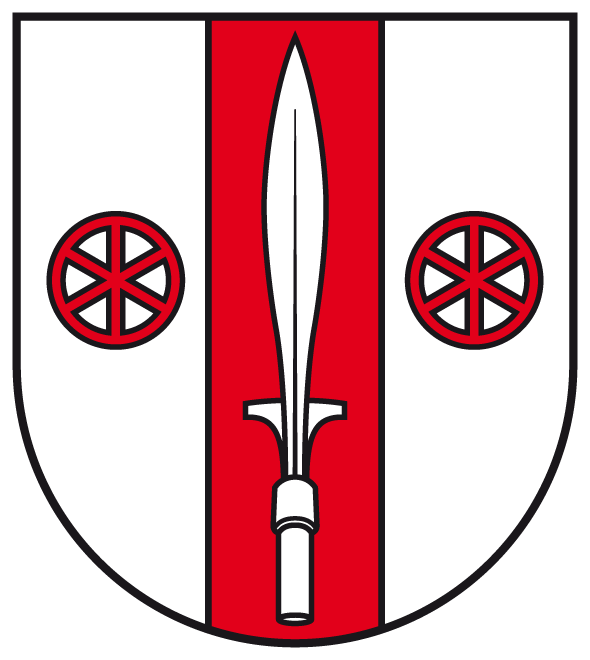
- Coat of arms
- Interactive map of Harbarnsen
- Location within Germany Location within Lower Saxony
- Coordinates: 51°59′N 09°58′E
- Country: Germany
- State: Lower Saxony
- District: Hildesheim
- Municipality: Lamspringe

Area
  - Total: 15.03 km^{2} (5.80 sq mi)
- Elevation: 189 m (620 ft)

Population (2015-12-31)
  - Total: 555
  - Density: 36.9/km^{2} (95.6/sq mi)
- Time zone: UTC+01:00 (CET)
  - Summer (DST): UTC+02:00 (CEST)
- Postal codes: 31097
- Dialling codes: 05060
- Vehicle registration: HI

Harbarnsen is a village and a former municipality in the district of Hildesheim in Lower Saxony, Germany. Since 1 November 2016, it is part of the municipality Lamspringe.

== Geography ==
Harbarnsen is situated in an agricultural region between the Weserbergland Schaumburg-Hameln Nature Park and the Harz, roughly 9 km southwest of Bad Salzdetfurth. Surrounding hill ranges, namely Sackwald, Harplage and Heber, are parts of the Lower Saxon Hills.

=== Division of the municipality ===
The municipality of Harbarnsen consisted of two districts, Harbarnsen and Irmenseul.

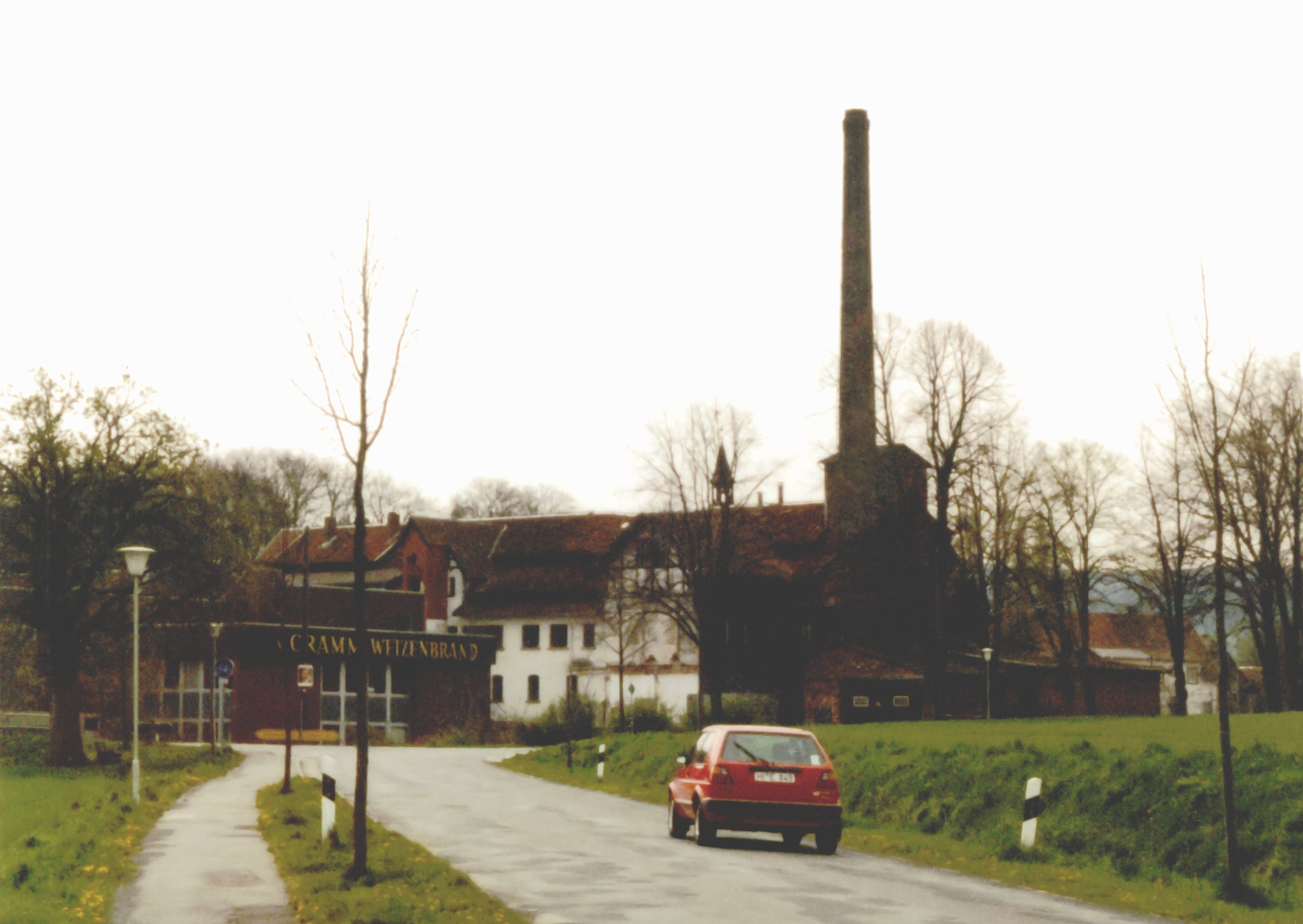
Old distillery in Harbarnsen, 1991

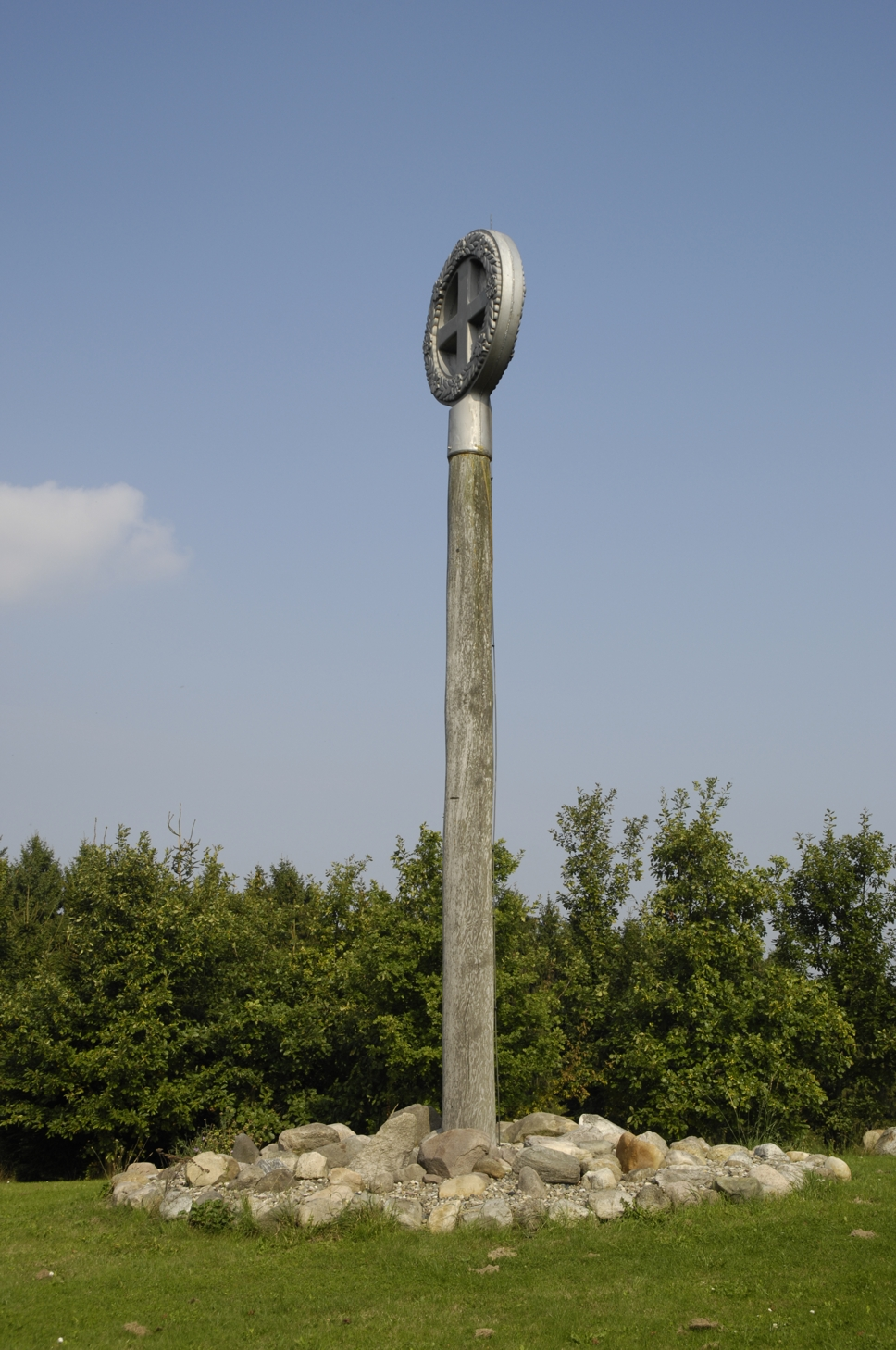
Irminsul reproduction in Irmenseul
