= Lamspringe =

- Municipality
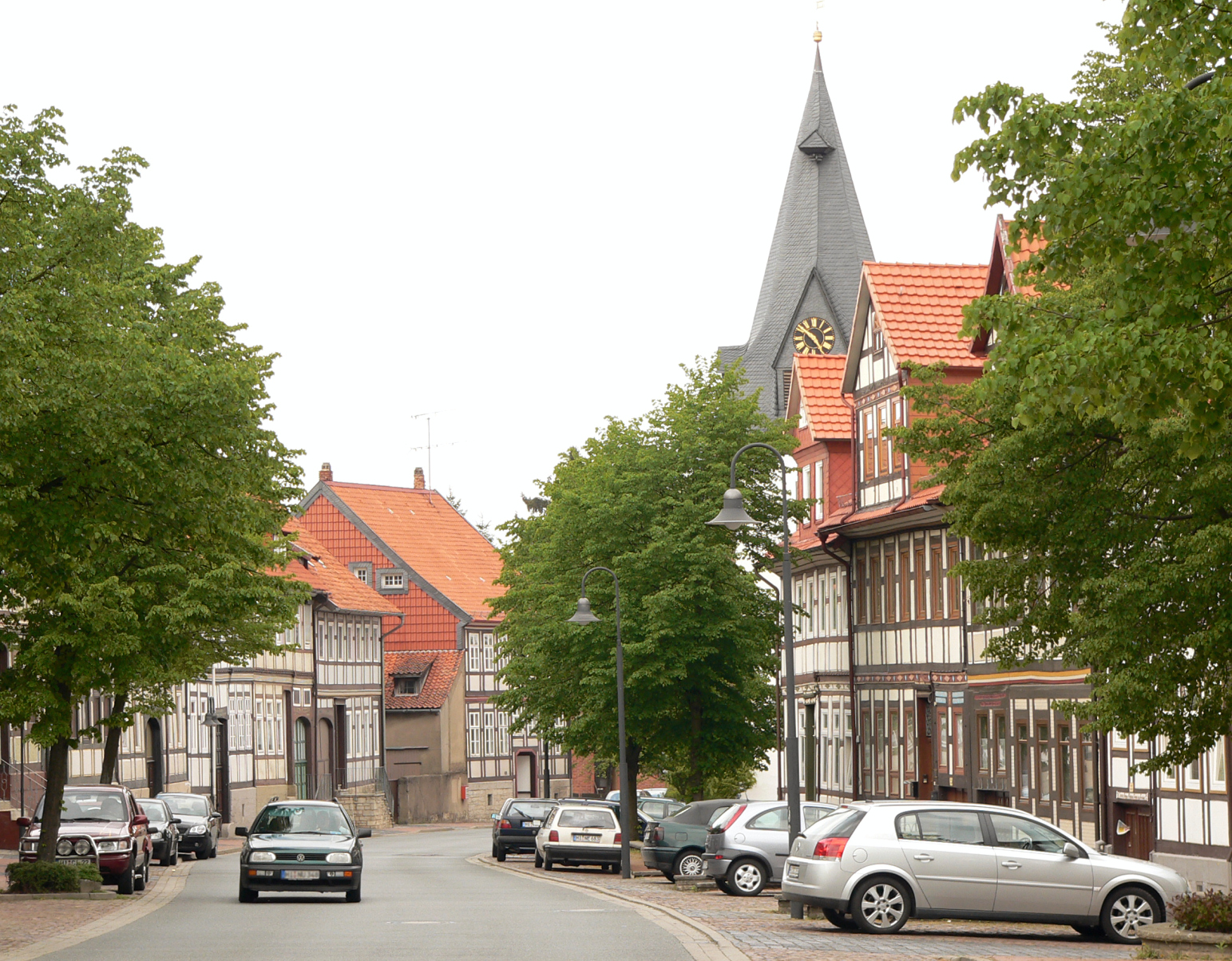
- Main street

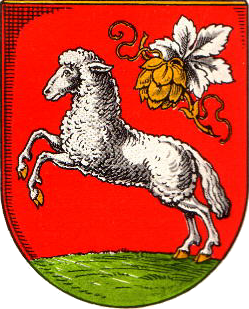
- Coat of arms

- Location of Lamspringe within Hildesheim district
- Interactive map of Lamspringe
- Location within Germany Location within Lower Saxony
- Coordinates: 51°57′N 10°00′E
- Country: Germany
- State: Lower Saxony
- District: Hildesheim

Government
  - Mayor (2021–26): Andreas Humbert

Area
  - Total: 70.46 km^{2} (27.20 sq mi)
- Elevation: 211 m (692 ft)

Population (2025-12-31)
  - Total: 5,377
  - Density: 76.31/km^{2} (197.6/sq mi)
- Time zone: UTC+01:00 (CET)
  - Summer (DST): UTC+02:00 (CEST)
- Postal codes: 31195
- Vehicle registration: HI
- Website: www.lamspringe.de

Lamspringe is a village and a municipality in the district of Hildesheim, in Lower Saxony, Germany. It is situated approximately 20 km south of Hildesheim. Since 1 November 2016, the former municipalities Harbarnsen, Neuhof, Sehlem and Woltershausen are part of the municipality Lamspringe. Lamspringe is known historically as the seat of the former Lamspringe Abbey, of which the church and other buildings remain.

Glashütte is a small settlement in the district of the Lamspringe community and located around 4 km east of Lamspringe on the L 466 state road to Rhüden in the Schlörbach valley. In the 18th century, the Lamspringe monastery founded a forest glassworks . It was located in the extensive wooded area of the Westerhof monastery forest, which borders the Heber ridge. In 1792 Johann Friedrich Stender from Ziegenhagen resumed glass production in the monastery forest and founded a glassworks with the Stender glass factory. The settlement was founded as a result of the glassworks.

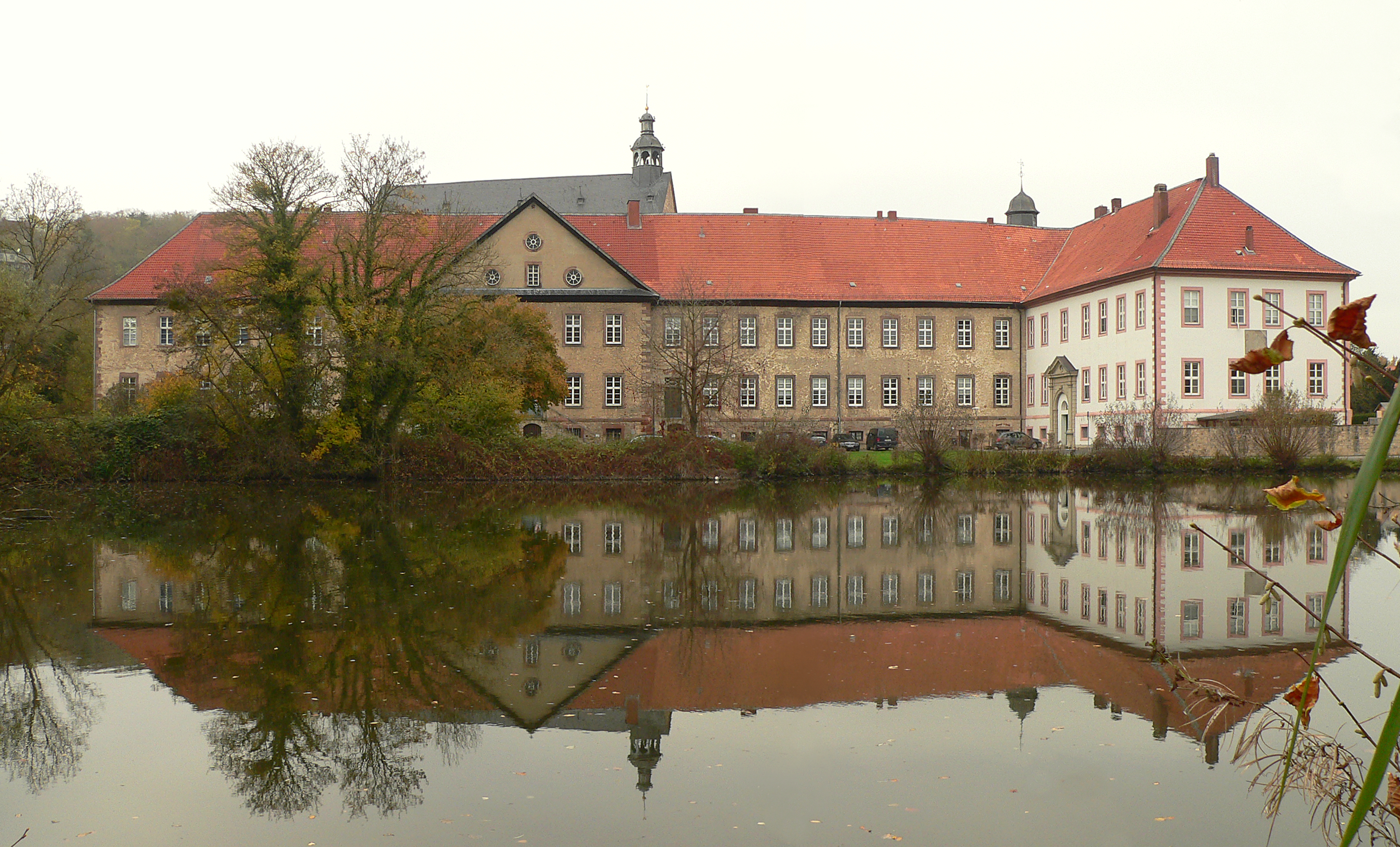
Lamspringe former monastery and Church

Lamspringe was the seat of the former Samtgemeinde ("collective municipality") Lamspringe.

== Sons and daughters of the place ==
- Kurt Hotmeyer (1905-1967), SS doctor
- Richard Mühe (1929-2009), watchmaker and physicist
- Lothar Hampe (born 1946), politician (CDU)
