= Searby =

Searby is both a surname and a given name. Notable people with the name include:

- John Searby (1900–1956), English cricketer
- Richard Searby (1931–2018), Australian lawyer
- Robin Searby (born 1947), British military officer
- Searby Buxton (1832-1919), New Zealand politician
- Edmund Wilson Searby (1896–1944), American United States Army officer

== See also ==
- Searby, Lincolnshire, village in England
