= Ampleforth Abbey =

Benedictine monastery in North Yorkshire, England

- The Abbey Church of St Laurence, Ampleforth
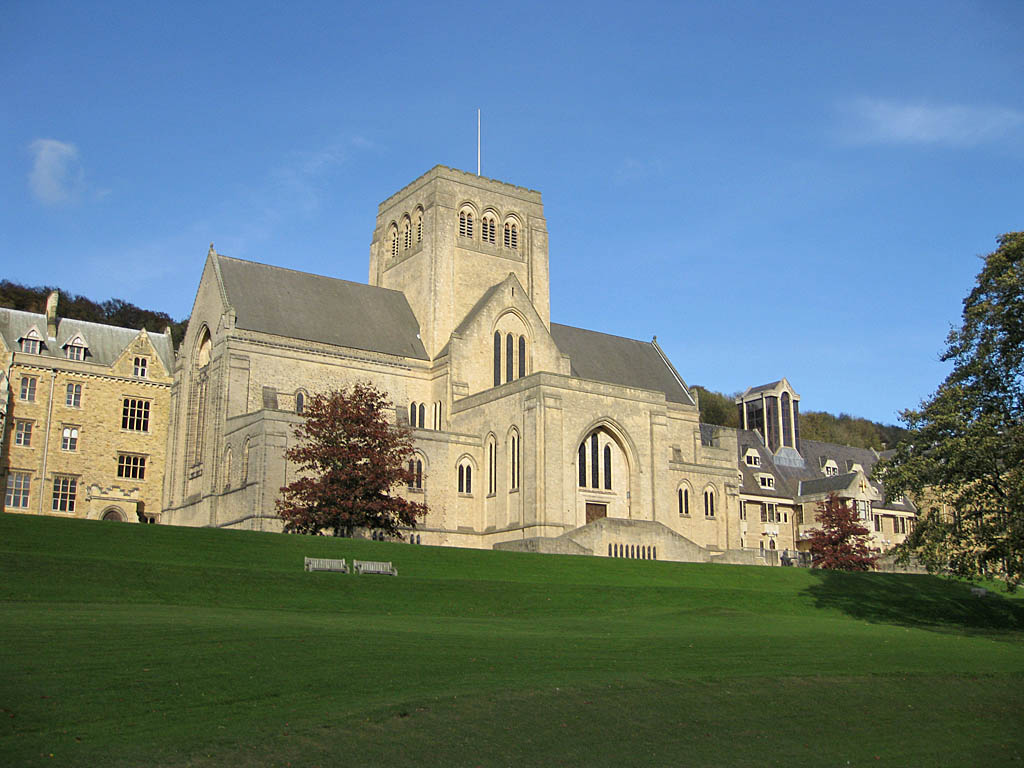

- Location within North Yorkshire
- 54.2018°N 1.0847°W
- OS grid reference: SE598788
- Location: Ampleforth, North Yorkshire
- Country: England
- Denomination: Catholic Church
- Website: Ampleforthabbey.org.uk

History
- Status: Abbey
- Founded: 1802
- Founder: Lady Anne Fairfax
- Dedication: St Laurence the Martyr

Architecture
- Functional status: Active
- Heritage designation: Grade I
- Designated: 9 September 1985

Administration
- Province: Liverpool
- Diocese: Middlesbrough
- Deanery: Central

Clergy
- Abbot: Robert Igo

Ampleforth Abbey is a monastery of Benedictine monks a mile to the east of Ampleforth, North Yorkshire, England, part of the English Benedictine Congregation. It descends from the pre-Reformation community at Westminster Abbey through the last surviving monk from Westminster, Sigebert Buckley (c. 1520 – c. 1610). As of 2024 the monastery has 41 monks, and sometimes will have 50 nuns of the monastery organization.

== History ==
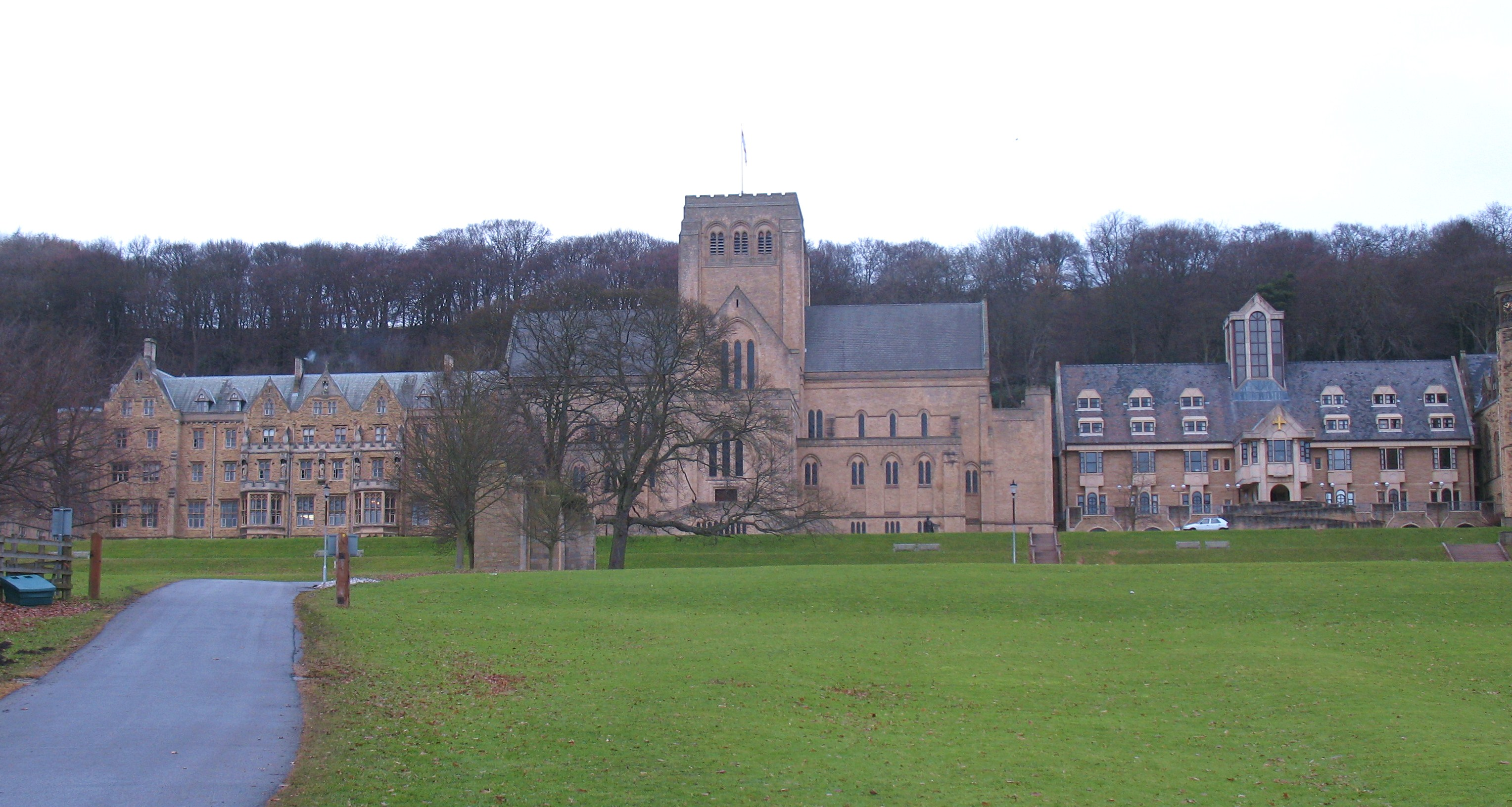
Monastery, Abbey Church and Main Hall

The Abbey was founded in a house given to Father Anselm Bolton by Lady Anne Fairfax, daughter of Charles Gregory Fairfax, 9th Viscount Fairfax of Emley. This house was taken over by Dr Brewer, President of the Congregation, on 30 July 1802. Since leaving Dieulouard in Lorraine, where its members had joined Spanish and Cassinese Benedictines to form the monastery of St Laurence, the community had been successively at Acton Burnell, Tranmere, Scholes, Vernon Hall and Parbold Hall, under its superior, Dr Marsh.

On its migration to Ampleforth Lodge Dr Marsh remained at Parbold and Father Appleton was elected the first prior of the new monastery. Shortly afterwards Parbold was broken up and the boys of the school there were transferred to Ampleforth. The priory was erected into an abbey in 1890 by the Bull Diu quidem est, and an important and flourishing college was founded. John Cuthbert Hedley, Bishop of Newport, was an alumnus, as was a superior of Ampleforth, Abbot Smith. The monastery was completed in 1897. The first abbey church was begun in 1857 and demolished in 1957. The existing Abbey church was begun in 1924 and consecrated in 1961, having been designed by notable architect Giles Gilbert Scott, replacing the mid-19th-century church of Charles Hansom.

=== Coat of arms ===
Coat of Arms

Blazon: Per fesse dancetté Or and Azure a chief per pale Gules and of the second charged on the dexter with two keys in saltire Or and Argent and on the sinister with a Cross Flory between five martlets of the first. Ensigned with an abbot's crosier in pale behind the shield Or garnished with a pallium crossing the staff argent and a galero with cords and twelve tassels disposed on either side of the shield in three rows of one, two, and three all Sable.

=== List of abbots ===
- 1900–1924: Oswald Smith OSB
- 1924–1939: Edmund Matthews OSB
- 1939–1963: Herbert Byrne OSB
- 1963–1976: Basil Hume OSB
- 1976–1984: Ambrose Griffiths OSB
- 1984–1997: Patrick Barry OSB
- 1997–2005: Timothy Wright OSB
- 2005–2021: Cuthbert Madden OSB
- 2021–present: Robert Igo OSB

== Architecture ==
The college buildings were begun by Charles Hansom in 1861 and have been enlarged on numerous occasions. The woodwork in the cafe and library is by Robert Thompson.

=== Abbey Church ===
The church is a grade I listed building. It was designed by Giles Gilbert Scott, and built in two phases, from 1922 to 1924, and 1958 to 1961. It is built in limestone and has roofs of various materials. The church has a cruciform plan, with a sanctuary at the crossing over which is a tower, a retrochoir to the west and a nave to the east, both with side chapels, and a narrow north aisle. Underneath is a crypt with 25 chapels. The tower has clasping buttresses, three pairs of bell openings on each face, and a lightly embattled parapet. The woodwork is by Thompson. Some of the stained glass is by Patrick Reyntiens, and other ones by Herbert Hendrie.

== Foundations ==
=== Ampleforth College ===
The monastery founded a school at Ampleforth in 1802. It is now the coeducational independent boarding school Ampleforth College, with about 600 pupils. In 2017 the college separated from the Abbey by splitting the site and each having its own independent governance. Monks from Ampleforth Abbey continue to oversee the spirituality scheme of the College.

=== Parishes ===
In addition to the work at Ampleforth, some of the monks are assigned as parish priests to parishes across four dioceses.

=== St Benet's Hall ===
Ampleforth had a permanent private hall at St Benet's Hall, Oxford, which was founded in 1897 for the purpose of enabling monks to study for secular degrees. It accepted lay undergraduates and graduate as well as monastic members. It ceased operation as a permanent private hall at the beginning of October 2022.

=== Saint Louis ===
Ampleforth founded a daughter house, the priory at St Louis, Missouri, in 1955. The priory gained independence in 1973 and became Saint Louis Abbey in its own right in 1989.

=== Zimbabwe ===
In 1996 Ampleforth set up the community of Christ the Word in Zimbabwe, which had three members as of 2020.

== Child abuse scandal ==
In November 2017, as part of its larger mandate, the national Independent Inquiry into Child Sexual Abuse (IICSA) undertook an investigation into the prevalence of paedophilia in the English Benedictine Congregation and its failures in protecting young people over many decades, focusing on the abbeys of Downside in Somerset, Ealing in London and Ampleforth in North Yorkshire. The final report outlined a series of failures at Ampleforth but also noted the ongoing efforts of both the Abbey and College to address the safeguarding concerns. It found credible allegations of physical, emotional and sexual abuse perpetrated by monks and lay members of Ampleforth. In addition safeguarding concerns were noted about some monks relating to grooming, inappropriate touching and pornography addiction. The Ampleforth monks named in the report included: Piers Grant-Ferris, Gregory Carroll, Bernard Green (deceased 2013) and a number of unidentified monks referred to as RC-F3, RC-F8, RC-F27, RC-F16, RC-F18, RC-F91 and RC-F95.

Abbot Christopher Jamison, then newly elected President of the English Benedictine Congregation, welcomed the report, apologising for the abuse and the congregation's failure to address it and urging other victims to come forward. Piers Grant-Ferris was convicted in 2006 of twenty counts of indecent assault. Peter Turner, formerly known as Gregory Carroll, was jailed for more than 20 years for his offences of child abuse.

== Gallery ==
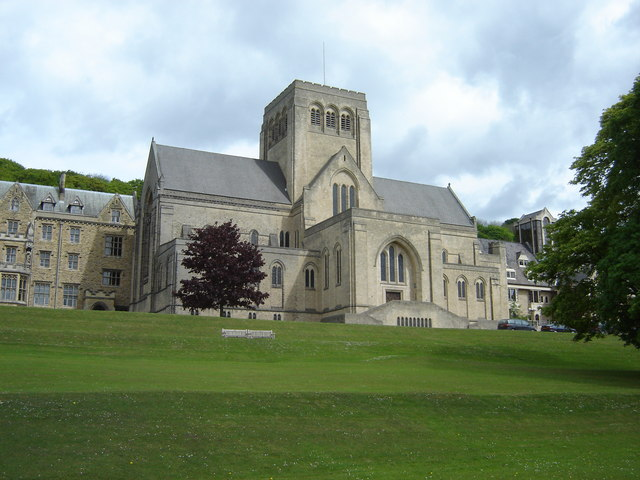
South Side of the Church

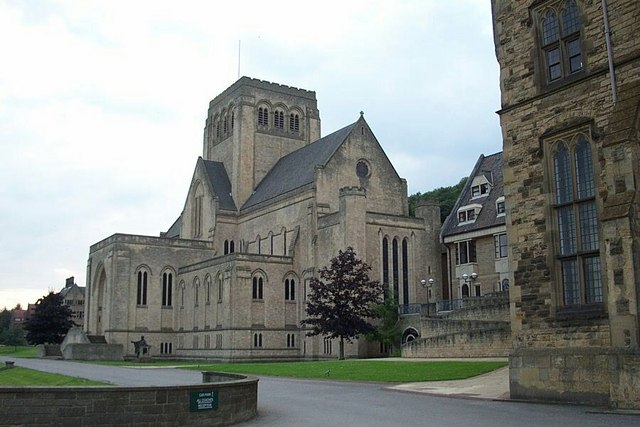
East Side of the Church

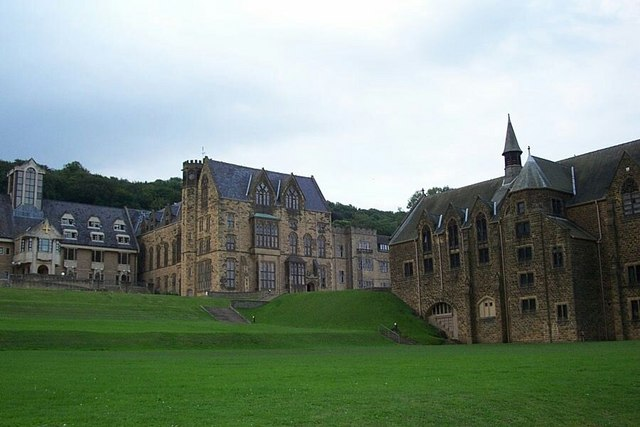
Ampleforth Abbey and College

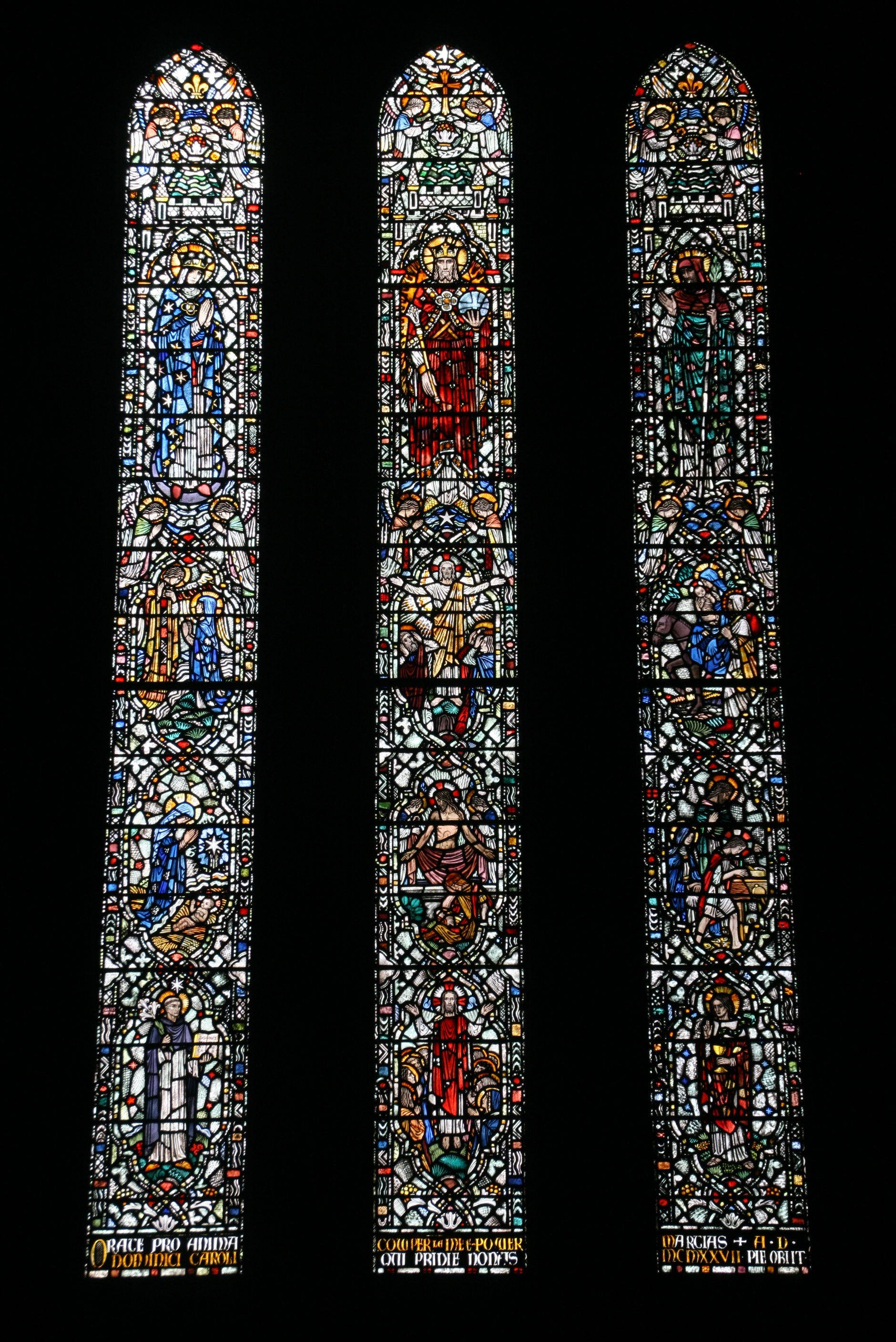
Window in Abbey Church

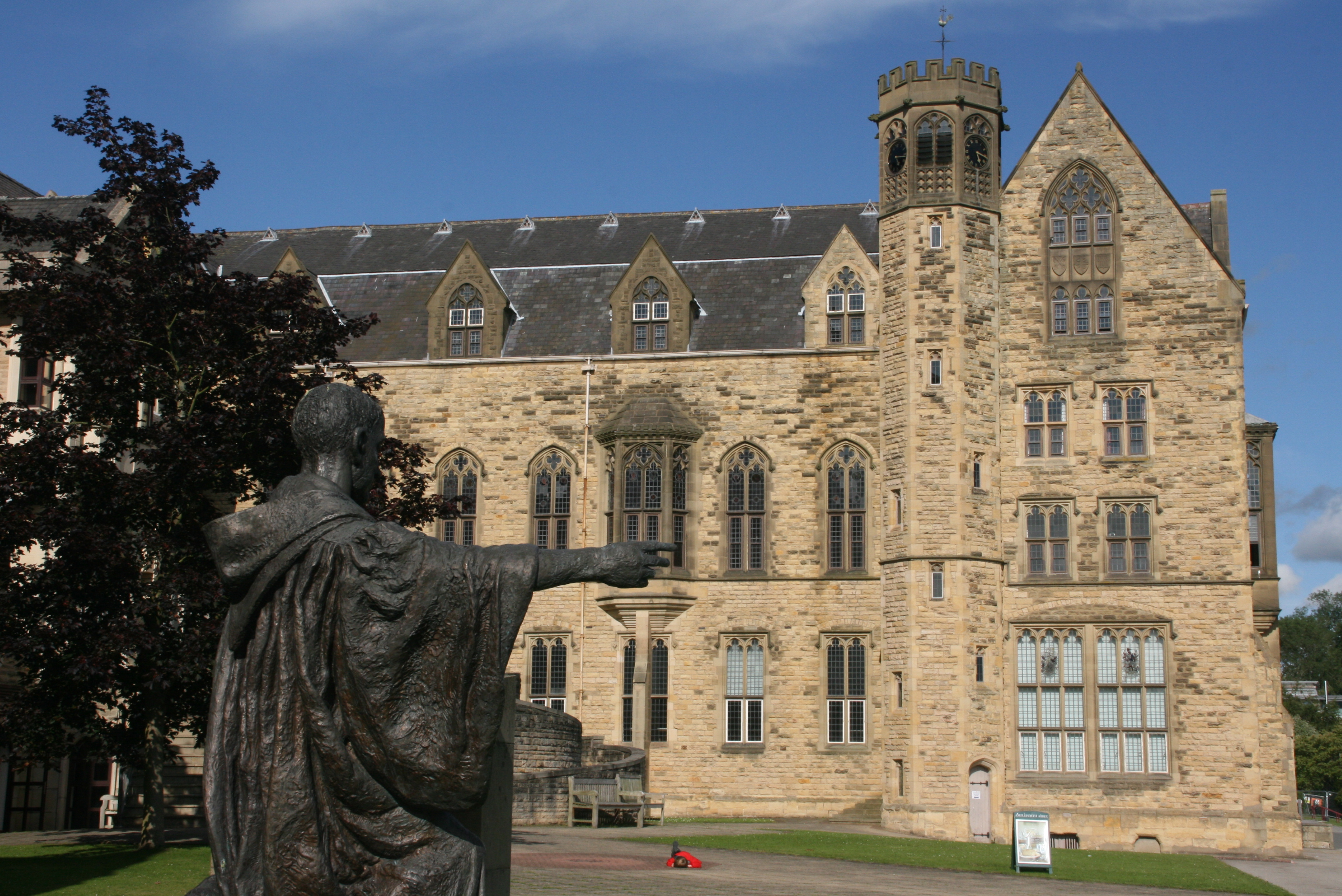
The courtyard

== See also ==
- Grade I listed buildings in North Yorkshire (district)
- Listed buildings in Ampleforth
- Ampleforth College
- St Benet's Hall, Oxford
- English Benedictine Congregation
- Benet Perceval
