= Sehlem, Lower Saxony =

Sehlem
- Ortsteil of Lamspringe
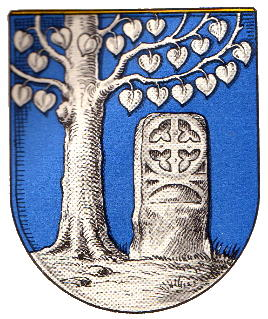
- Coat of arms
- Interactive map of Sehlem
- Location within Germany Location within Lower Saxony
- Coordinates: 52°00′49″N 09°58′34″E
- Country: Germany
- State: Lower Saxony
- District: Hildesheim
- Municipality: Lamspringe

Area
  - Total: 12.77 km^{2} (4.93 sq mi)
- Elevation: 140 m (460 ft)

Population (2015-12-31)
  - Total: 842
  - Density: 65.9/km^{2} (171/sq mi)
- Time zone: UTC+01:00 (CET)
  - Summer (DST): UTC+02:00 (CEST)
- Postal codes: 31196
- Dialling codes: 05060
- Vehicle registration: HI

Sehlem is a village and a former municipality in the district of Hildesheim in Lower Saxony, Germany. Since 1 November 2016, it is part of the municipality Lamspringe.
