= Dieulouard =

- Commune
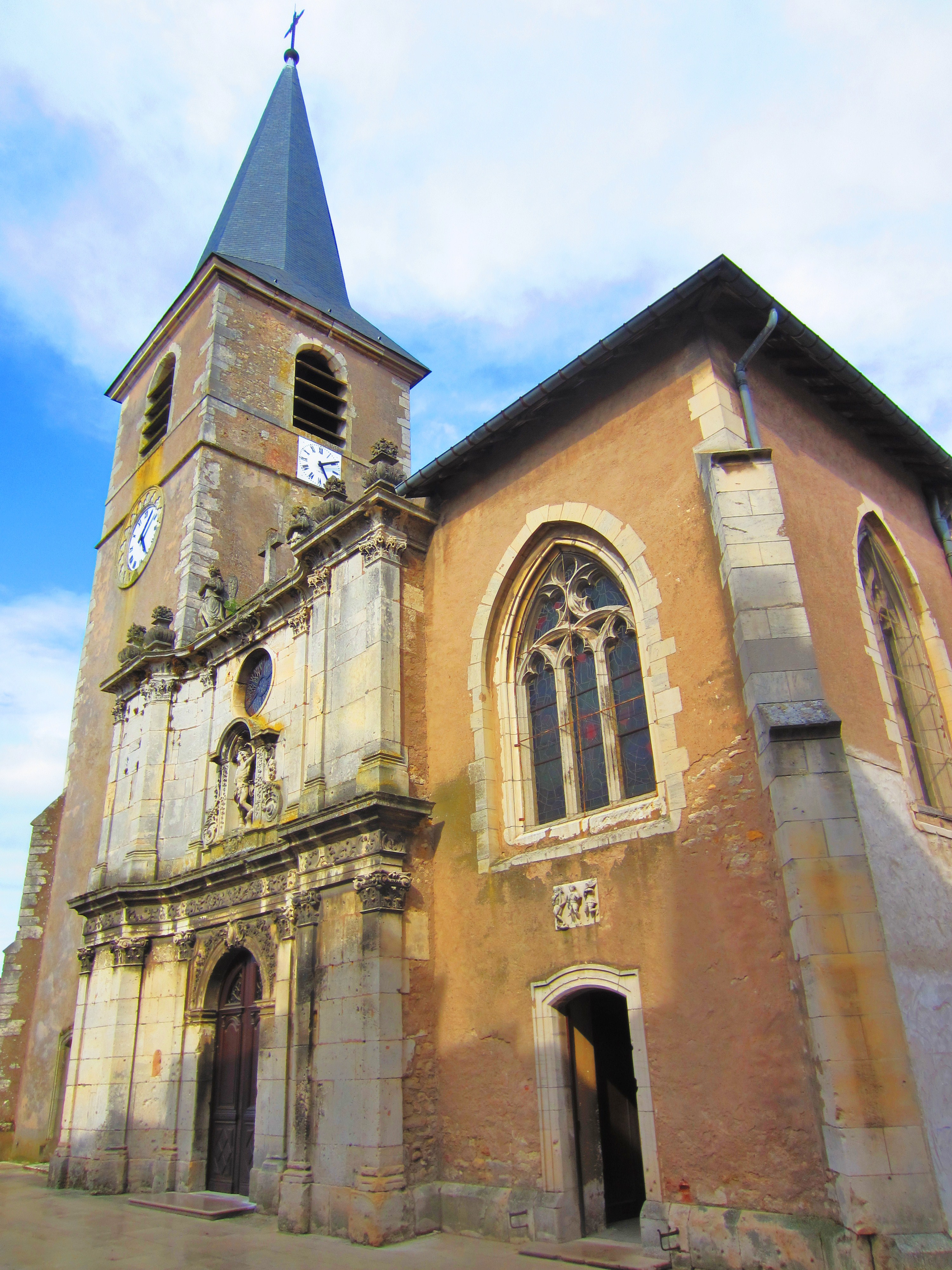
- The church in Dieulouard

- Coat of arms
- Location of Dieulouard
- Location within France Location within Grand Est
- Coordinates: 48°50′26″N 6°04′14″E
- Country: France
- Region: Grand Est
- Department: Meurthe-et-Moselle
- Arrondissement: Nancy
- Canton: Entre Seille et Meurthe

Government
  - Mayor (2020–2026): Henri Poirson
- Area^{1}: 17.69 km^{2} (6.83 sq mi)
- Elevation: 185 m (607 ft)
- Highest elevation: 307 m (1,007 ft)
- Lowest elevation: 177 m (581 ft)
- Population (2023): 4,581
  - Density: 259.0/km^{2} (670.7/sq mi)
- Time zone: UTC+01:00 (CET)
  - Summer (DST): UTC+02:00 (CEST)
- INSEE/Postal code: 54157 /54380
- ^{1} French Land Register data, which excludes lakes, ponds, glaciers > 1 km^{2} (0.386 sq mi or 247 acres) and river estuaries.

Dieulouard (French pronunciation: [djølwaʁ]; formerly Dieulwart) is a commune in the Meurthe-et-Moselle department in north-eastern France. Dieulouard is located between Pont-à-Mousson and Nancy, on the left bank of the Moselle. It is the location of the Gallo-Roman city of Scarpone.

In August 1608 a small group of exiled English Benedictines were given a deserted collegiate church in the town. The church was dedicated to St Laurence and so the monks adopted him as the patron of their community. During the French Revolution the community was forced to flee France. In 1802 the monks settled at Ampleforth Abbey in North Yorkshire.

== Population ==
Historical population
Year	Pop.	±% p.a.
1968	5,332	—
1975	5,372	+0.11%
1982	5,212	−0.43%
1990	4,903	−0.76%
1999	4,767	−0.31%
2007	4,616	−0.40%
2012	4,545	−0.31%
2017	4,763	+0.94%
2023	4,581	−0.65%
Source: INSEE

== See also ==
- Communes of the Meurthe-et-Moselle department
- Parc naturel régional de Lorraine
