= Don (honorific) =

Honorific prefix

The terms Don (in Spanish and Italian), Dom (in Portuguese), and Domn (in Romanian), are honorific prefixes derived from the Latin Dominus, meaning "lord" or "owner". (Note: Spanish: [don]; Italian: [dɔn]; [dõ].) The honorific is commonly used in Spain, Portugal, and Italy, as well as in the Spanish-speaking world and Portuguese-speaking world, as well as some other places formerly colonized by Spain or Portugal. The feminine equivalents are Doña (Spanish: [ˈdoɲa]), Donna (Italian: [ˈdɔnna]), Doamnă (Romanian) and Dona (Portuguese: [ˈdonɐ]), meaning "lady".

The term is derived from the Latin dominus: a master of a household, a title with background from the Roman Republic in classical antiquity. With the abbreviated form having emerged as such in the Middle Ages, traditionally it is reserved for Catholic clergy and nobles, in addition to certain educational authorities and persons of high distinction.

== Spanish-speaking world ==
In Spanish, although originally a title reserved for royalty, select nobles, and church hierarchs, it is now often used as a mark of esteem for an individual of personal, social or official distinction, such as a longstanding community leader, a person of significant wealth, a noble, or the member of an order of merit. As a style, rather than a title or rank, it is used with, rather than in place of, a person's name.

Historically, don was used to address members of the nobility, e.g. hidalgos, as well as members of the secular clergy. The treatment gradually came to be reserved for persons of the blood royal, e.g. Don John of Austria, and those of such acknowledged high or ancient aristocratic birth as to be noble de Juro e Herdade, that is, "by right and heredity" rather than by the king's grace. However, there were rare exemptions to the rule, such as the mulatto Miguel Enríquez who received the distinction from Philip V due to his privateering work in the Caribbean. It is now often used as a more formal version of Señor, a term which itself was also once used to address someone with the quality of nobility (not necessarily holding a nobiliary title).

Today in the Spanish language, Doña is used to respectfully refer to a mature woman. In present-day Hispanic America, the title Don or Doña is sometimes used in honorific form when addressing a senior citizen. In some countries, Don or Doña may be used as a generic honorific, similar to "sir" and "ma'am" in the United States.

=== Spain ===
During the reign of King Juan Carlos of Spain, from 1975 until his abdication on 19 June 2014, he was titled Su Majestad [S. M.] el Rey Juan Carlos (His Majesty King Juan Carlos). Following the abdication, Royal Decree 1368/1987 gave Juan Carlos and his wife the official style S. M. el Rey Don Juan Carlos (H.M. King Juan Carlos) and S. M. la Reina Doña Sofía (H.M. Queen Sofía)—the same as during his reign, with the honorific Don/Doña prefixed to the names. Don Juan Carlos' successor is S. M. el Rey Felipe VI.

Spanish law grants Spanish nationals who are Knights or Dames of the Order of Civil Merit, the Order of Charles III, and the Order of Isabella the Catholic the formal style Don (for Knights) or Doña (for Dames), used in the same way as Sir or Dame for knighted British nationals.

The usage is similar among Basque speakers in Spain using don and doña. The honorific is sometimes adapted as on as in the priest and scholar on Joxemiel Barandiaran (Spanish: Don José Miguel Barandiarán) or fictional knight On Kixote (Don Quixote).

=== Hispanic America ===
The honorific title Don was widely used in Crown documents throughout Hispanic America by those in nobility or landed gentry. It can be found in the many 'Padrones' and "Aguas y Tierras" records in Mexican archives. The honorific in modern times is also widely used throughout the Americas. This is the case of the Mexican New Age author Don Miguel Ángel Ruiz, the Chilean television personality Don Francisco, and the Puerto Rican industrialist and politician Don Luis Ferré, among many other figures. Although Puerto Rican politician Pedro Albizu Campos had a doctoral degree, he has been titled Don. Likewise, Puerto Rican Governor Luis Muñoz Marín has often been called Don Luís Muñoz Marin instead of Governor Muñoz Marin. In the same manner, Don Miguel Ángel Ruiz is an M.D. Additionally the honorific is usually used with people of older age.

The same happens in other Hispanic American countries. For example, despite having a doctoral degree in theology, the Paraguayan dictator José Gaspar Rodríguez de Francia was usually styled as "Don". Likewise, despite being a respected military commander with the rank of Brigade General, Argentine Ruler Juan Manuel de Rosas was formally and informally styled "Don" as a more important title.

Prior to the American control of the Southwest, a number of Americans immigrated to California, where they often became Mexican citizens and changed their given names to Spanish equivalents, for example "Juan Temple" for Jonathan Temple. It was common for them to assume the honorific "don" once they had attained a significant degree of distinction in the community.

== Italy ==
Officially, Don (Donna: feminine) was the honorific title exclusively reserved for a member of a high noble family such as principe or a duca, excluding a marchese or a conte (and any legitimate, male-line descendant thereof). A reigning prince or duke would also be entitled to some form of the higher style of Altezza (e.g. Sua Altezza Serenissima, Sua Altezza Reale) in addition to the Don. This was how the style was used in the Almanach de Gotha for extant families in its third section focused on the 200 non sovereign princely and ducal families of Europe.

The last official Italian nobility law (abrogated 1948) stated that the style belonged to members of the following groups:

- those whose main title was principe, duca, marchese or conte;
- those who had a special grant;
- those to whom it had been recognized by the former Lombardy (Duchy of Milan); or
- those from the Kingdom of Sardinia who bore either a title of hereditary knight or of the titled nobility (whatever the main title of the family).

Genealogical databases and dynastic works still reserve the title for this class of noble by tradition, although it is no longer a right under Italian law.

In practice, however, the style Don/Donna (or Latin Dominus/Domina) was used more loosely in church, civil and notarial records. The honorific was often accorded to the untitled gentry (e.g., knights or younger sons of noblemen), priests, or other people of distinction. It was, over time, adopted by organized criminal societies in Southern Italy (including Naples, Sicily, and Calabria) to refer to members who held considerable sway within their hierarchies.

In modern Italy, the title is usually only given to Catholic diocesan priests (never to prelates, who bear higher honorifics such as monsignore, eminenza, and so on). In Sardinia, until recently it was commonly used for nobility (whether titled or not), but it is being presently used mainly when the speaker wants to show that he knows the don's condition of nobility.

Outside of the priesthood or old nobility, usage is still common in Southern Italy, mostly as an honorific form to address the elderly, but it is rarely, if ever, used in Central Italy or Northern Italy. It can be used satirically or ironically to lampoon a person's sense of self-importance.

Don is prefixed either to the full name or to the person's given name. The form "Don Lastname" for crime bosses (as in Don Corleone) is an American custom. In Southern Italy, mafia bosses are addressed as "Don Firstname" by other mafiosi and sometimes their victims as well, while the press usually refers to them as "Firstname Lastname", without the honorific.

Priests are the only ones to be referred as "Don" plus the last name (e.g. Don Marioni), although when talking directly to them they are usually addressed as "Don" plus the first name (e.g. Don Francesco), which is also the most common form used by parishioners when referring to their priest.

== Portuguese-speaking world ==
The usage of Dom was a prerogative of princes of royal blood and also of other individuals to whom it had been granted by the sovereign. In most cases, the title was passed on through the male line. Strictly speaking, only females born of a nobleman bearing the title Dom would be addressed as Dona ('D.ª'), but the style was not heritable through daughters. The few exceptions depended solely on the conditions upon which the title itself had been granted. A well-known exception is the descent of Dom Vasco da Gama.

There were many cases, both in Portugal and Brazil, in which the title of Dom (or Dona) was conceded to, and even bought by, people who were not from royalty. In any case, when the title was officially recognized by the proper authority, it became part of the name.

In Portugal and Brazil, Dom (pronounced [ˈdõ]) is used for certain higher members hierarchs, such as superiors, of the Catholic and Eastern Orthodox churches. In Catholic religious orders, such as the Order of Saint Benedict, it is also associated with the status of Dom Frater. Dom is similarly used as an honorific for Benedictine monks within the Benedictine Order throughout France and the English speaking world, such as the famous Dom Pérignon. In France, it is also used within the male branch of the Carthusian Order.

It is also employed for laymen who belong to the royal and imperial families (for example the House of Aviz in Portugal and the House of Braganza in Portugal and Brazil). It was also accorded to members of families of the titled Portuguese nobility. Unless ennobling letters patent specifically authorised its use, Dom was not attributed to members of Portugal's untitled nobility: Since hereditary titles in Portugal descended according to primogeniture, the right to the style of Dom was the only apparent distinction between cadets of titled families and members of untitled noble families.

In the Portuguese language, the feminine form, Dona (or, more politely, Senhora Dona), has become common when referring to a woman who does not hold an academic title. It is commonly used to refer to First Ladies.

== Other places ==
=== Philippines ===
In the Spanish colonial Philippines, this honorific was reserved to the nobility, the prehispanic datu that became the principalía, whose right to rule was recognised by Philip II on 11 June 1594. Similar to Latin America, the title Don is considered highly honoured, more so than academic titles such as "Doctor", political titles such as "Governor", and even knights titled "Sir". Usage was retained during the American period, although traditional official positions of the principalía (e.g., gobernadorcillo and cabeza de barangay) were replaced by American political positions such as the municipal president. The practise slowly faded after World War II, as heirs of the principalía often did not inherit the title, and as civic leaders were chosen by popular election. Prior to 1954, the appointment and tenure of mayors was at the pleasure of the president of the Philippines, pursuant to Commonwealth Act No. 158 amending Commonwealth Act No. 57., Section 8 of Commonwealth Act No. 158, as amended by Republic Act No. 276. The 1987 Constitution, meanwhile, explicitly prohibits recognition of titles of nobility, thus the terms Don and Doña are now courtesy titles with no requirements for their attainment other than common usage for socially prominent and rich persons.

=== Croatia ===
Within the Catholic Church, the prefix Don is usually used for the diocesan priests with their first name, as well as velečasni (The Reverend).

=== Japan ===
In the House of Councillors, the term refers to a senior ruling‑party lawmaker who leads the party’s members in the chamber and wields significant influence in national politics.

== Religious usage ==
Dom is used as a title in English for certain Benedictine (including some communities which follow the Rule of St. Benedict) and Carthusian monks, and for members of certain communities of canons regular. Examples include Benedictine monks of the English Benedictine Congregation (e.g. Dom John Chapman, late Abbot of Downside). Since the Second Vatican Council, the title can be given to any monk (lay or ordained) who has made a solemn profession. The equivalent title for a nun is "Dame" (e.g. Dame Laurentia McLachlan, late Abbess of Stanbrook, or Dame Felicitas Corrigan, author).

== In popular culture ==
In the United States, Don has also been made popular by films depicting the Italian mafia, such as The Godfather trilogy, where the crime boss is given by his associates the same signs of respect that were traditionally granted in Italy to nobility. However, the honorific followed by the last name (e.g. Don Corleone) would be used in Italy for priests only: the proper Italian respectful form is similar to the Spanish-language form in that it is applied only to the first name (e.g. "Don Vito"). This title has in turn been applied by the media to real-world mafia figures, such as the nickname "Teflon Don" for John Gotti. It is also used in American TV series Breaking Bad and Better Call Saul.

== See also ==
- Dominus (title)
