= The Best of Friends (play) =

The Best of Friends is an epistolary play by Hugh Whitemore about the friendship of George Bernard Shaw, Sydney Cockerell and Dame Laurentia McLachlan, based on the lengthy correspondence that passed between them for over 25 years. It was inspired by The Nun, the Infidel, and the Superman, a book by Dame Felicitas Corrigan, a Benedictine nun at Stanbrook Abbey in the U.K.

George Bernard Shaw is considered one of the most important English-language playwrights of the 20th century. Sydney Cockerell was the curator of the Fitzwilliam Museum of the University of Cambridge and was well-connected to many intellectuals of his time. Dame Laurentia was a Benedictine nun and Abbess of Stanbrook from 1931 to 1953 and an authority on church music.

Originally produced as a stage play it first ran at the Apollo Theatre in London in 1988, with Ray McAnally as Shaw, Sir John Gielgud as Cockerell, and Rosemary Harris as McLachlan.

In 1991 it was filmed for television, under the direction of Alvin Rakoff, with Patrick McGoohan as Shaw, Sir John Gielgud, and Dame Wendy Hiller.

The play was also recorded as a radio dramatisation by the BBC and broadcast on BBC Radio 4 on 30 March 1991. Gielgud was joined by Denys Hawthorne as Shaw and Rosemary Harris as McLachlan.

The play was performed in New York City in 1993 with Roy Dotrice as Shaw, Michael Allinson and Diana Douglas. It was revived in 2006 at Hampstead Theatre, London and on tour, with Roy Dotrice, Michael Pennington and Patricia Routledge.
