= St Mary's Abbey, Colwich =

Monastery in Staffordshire, England

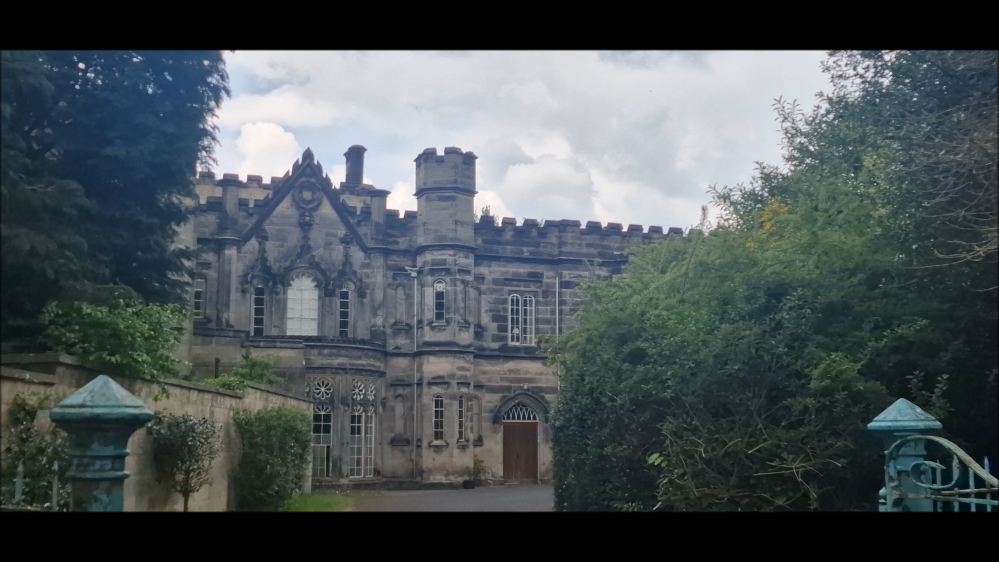
- St Mary's Abbey, Colwich in 2025

- Location within Staffordshire
- Interactive map of St Mary's Abbey, Colwich

Monastery information
- Full name: St Mary's Abbey, Colwich
- Order: Benedictine
- Established: 1623
- Dedication: St Mary
- Diocese: Birmingham
- Controlled churches: St Mary's Abbey

Site
- Location: Colwich, Staffordshire, England
- Coordinates: 52.7900°N 1.9895°W

St Mary's Abbey in Colwich, Staffordshire was an abbey of Roman Catholic nuns of the English Benedictine Congregation, founded in 1623 at Cambrai, Flanders, in the Spanish Netherlands, and closed down in 2020. During the French Revolution, the community was expelled from France and settled at Mount Pleasant, Colwich, in 1836, where it remained for the next 84 years.

== History ==
=== Background ===
St Mary's Abbey of English Benedictine nuns had its origins in 1623 at Cambrai in the Spanish Netherlands. At that time, persecution made it impossible for women to become nuns in England. By 1645, the Cambrai community under Abbess Catherine Gascoigne had increased to 50 nuns, and was living in conditions of extreme poverty. On 6 February 1652, the community was established in Paris as the Priory of Our Lady of Good Hope under Dame Bridget More as their Prioress. She was a direct descendant of the martyr, St Thomas More, and had been taught at Cambrai under the spiritual supervision of the mystical theologian, Dom Augustine Baker.

=== Relocation ===
In the French Revolution, the abbey was suppressed and the nuns were imprisoned, first in the monastery and then in the Château de Vincennes. When released in 1795, they settled in England, first in Dorset and then at Cannington in Somerset. In 1836, they finally settled at Mount Pleasant, Colwich, an 18th-century building which had been rebuilt in Gothic style.

In 1928, the St Benedict's Priory was raised to the rank of an Abbey, and the house was renamed St Mary's Abbey. A daughter house, the Priory of St Scholastica, at Atherstone in Warwickshire, continued as a separate community until 1967 when the nuns returned to Colwich. The estate at Atherstone was sold in 1967, and the priory building demolished in 1968.

=== Closure ===
In May 2020, due to falling numbers in the community, the Holy See approved the affiliation of St Mary’s Abbey, Colwich, with Stanbrook Abbey. The community had declined in numbers to five, and two of these were infirm. The nuns decided to close down the monastery and disperse, this taking place on 31 October as announced on the monastery website. The two infirm nuns were remaining in care at Oulton Abbey, two were transferring to Stanbrook Abbey and the abbess was remaining on site for a year. The last abbess was Dame Davina Sharp.

The property was put up for sale and some of its furnishings sent to auction.

== Buildings ==
The abbey was first built around 1750 as a house, which was gradually enlarged. The abbey buildings are mainly in stone, with parts in brick and parts rendered, and with slate roofs. The main building is in Gothic Revival style, and on the front are two turrets with a gabled section between. At the rear are various buildings arranged around a courtyard, and the grounds are enclosed by tall brick walls. It is Grade II listed. The mortuary chapel in the grounds of the abbey is also Grade II.

== Re opening ==
In June 2024 it was announced that the Benedictines of Mary, Queen of Apostles, from Missouri, were taking over St Mary's Abbey, Colwich, as their first European house.

== See also ==
- List of abbeys and priories
- Listed buildings in Colwich, Staffordshire
