= Meinrad Craighead =

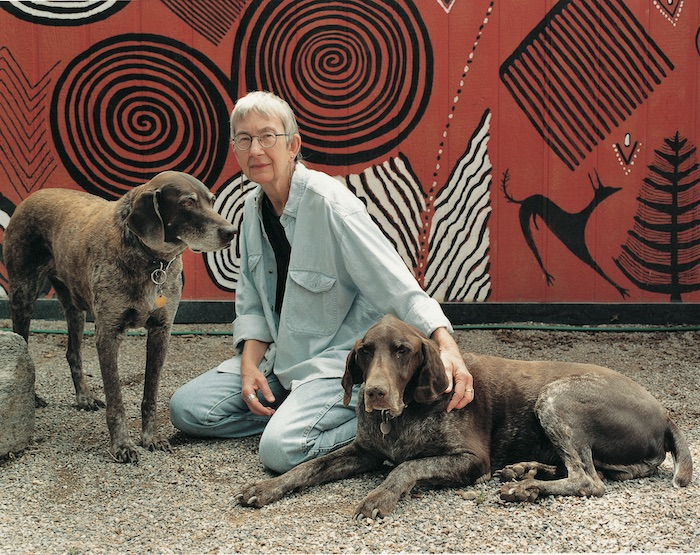
- Meinrad Red Wall Meinrad Craighead with Akkama and Brimos in the Erdahaus ritual area, 1999. Photo: Gay Block
- Born: Charlene Marie Craighead; February 12, 1936
- Died: April 8, 2019 (aged 83)
- Occupation: Artist

Meinrad Craighead (February 12, 1936 – April 8, 2019) was an American artist, writer, and visionary. Her work explores feminine faces of the divine, mystical experiences, and the sacredness of the natural world.

== Early life and education ==
Meinrad Craighead was born Charlene Marie Craighead on February 12, 1936, in North Little Rock, Arkansas. The daughter of Marie Catherine Engster and Charles O'Connor Craighead Jr., she was the eldest of three girls in a Catholic family. Craighead's family moved to Houston, Texas a few years after her birth. She "led a deeply intuitive life from an early age" and in the 1940s she began drawing with the charcoal sticks which her father had given her. Craighead experienced her first "real religious experience" at the age of seven during an experience in nature with her dog.

Craighead's father moved to Chicago to seek work when she was eight years old. Craighead, her mother, and her sisters moved back to North Little Rock for a few years before joining her father in Chicago. From 1945 to 1947, Craighead attended St. Jerome parish school, a Catholic school in Chicago, but spent her summers in North Little Rock, Arkansas, with her maternal grandparents. Craighead attributed her love of travel and yearning for pilgrimages to these summer journeys early in her life.

In 1947, Craighead's family moved to Milwaukee, Wisconsin, where Craighead attended St. Elizabeth parish school, another Catholic institution, for two years. At St. Elizabeth, Craighead's teachers encouraged her to take special art classes and explore museums. Craighead next attended Holy Angels Academy, where she spent ample time in the art department and discovered prominent Catholic writers such as Thomas Merton and Dorothy Day.

In December 1950, when Craighead was 14 years old, her maternal grandmother died. Mourning her grandmother became one of Craighead's first experiences of grief, a theme that would later feature prominently in her work.

By the time Craighead was a teenager, she spent hours drawing each day. From 1954 to 1958, Craighead attended Clarke College, a small, Catholic women's college in Dubuque, Iowa, where she earned her bachelor's degree. In 1956 she spent her junior year in Vienna, through Clarke College's Institute of European Studies, to attend drawing classes. She stopped to pray in the Karlskirche, where she happened to find a pamphlet with a photo of Bruder Meinrad Eügster, her maternal great-great uncle. Brother Meinrad had been a monk at the Benedictine monastery of Einsiedeln in Switzerland and was regarded for his humility and holiness. This discovery represented a pivotal moment for Craighead, who "knew [she] had to visit the monastery where he had lived" and became curious about the Black Madonna associated with Einsiedeln.

In 1960, Craighead received a Master of Fine Arts from the University of Wisconsin–Madison. She described Alfred Sessler, her graduate school mentor, as "the finest teacher [she] ever had."

== Career ==
=== New Mexico (1960–1962) ===
Craighead moved to the Southwest after graduating from the University of Wisconsin–Madison and accepting a teaching job in the art department at the College of St. Joseph on the Rio Grande in Albuquerque, New Mexico. In New Mexico, Craighead "found the land that matched [her] interior landscape." Here, she taught classes, began hand printing gesso relief prints, and explored Native American traditions in the Southwest (particularly the spiritual practices of the Hopi people).

=== Europe (1962–1983) ===
After two years at the College of St. Joseph, Craighead was invited to be a part-time instructor in a graduate program in art, art history, and music for American students, administered by the Sinsinawa Dominican Sisters at the Villa Schifanoia San Domenico di Fiesole, a village outside Florence, Italy. Craighead also worked as a part-time instructor of an art history course for American students at Gonzaga University, Florence. She continued her own artistic work and gravitated from gesso relief printmaking back to charcoal drawings.

In 1965, Craighead moved to Spain to study early medieval Catalan art on a Fulbright grant. She rented a room in the bell tower of a monastery of Benedictine nuns on the mountain of Montserrat, near Barcelona. The remote mountaintop monastery at Montserrat is best known for its shrine to the Black Madonna. For ten months, Craighead sought solitude and darkness while working on large, abstract charcoal drawings in her room in the bell tower. In 2012, she donated a suite of 23 of these large, abstract charcoal drawings to the Art Museum at the University of New Mexico in Albuquerque. Craighead prayed to the Black Madonna daily and began creating large charcoal drawings of the Black Madonna while looking out over the landscape and wildlife at Montserrat.

In November 1966, Craighead entered Stanbrook Abbey outside Worcester, England, to try her vocation as a contemplative nun there. The Abbess gave her the name "Sister Meinrad" in honor of her great-great uncle. At Stanbrook Abbey, she made block prints, charcoal drawings, and began working with black ink on scratchboard. Immersed now in the imagery of the psalms being recited at the various hours of the day by the community, Craighead started a new series of relief prints, using vivid imagery from the Scriptures and the Gnostic gospels. Her prints became popular and she accrued a devoted following by selling hand-printed images in the monastery's gift shop. Charcoal remained her favorite medium, and she soon began to work on large charcoals which received acclaim beyond the monastery. At this time Craighead was also working on a book about trees, inspired by the magnificent trees surrounding the monastery. Artists House published The Sign of the Tree in 1979.

In 1975, Craighead's mother died. The abbey gave Craighead a time of seclusion, during which she mourned her mother and created small charcoal drawings, for which she composed accompanying haiku. The Stanbrook Abbey Press published twenty of these drawings and sixteen of the haiku in 1976 under the book title The Mother's Birds. Craighead stayed in the monastery for fourteen years. At the end of that period, she came to the conclusion that "her need to live as a solitary, a contemplative, could not be met at the abbey." Craighead left Stanbrook Abbey in October 1980.

The Arts Council of Great Britain provided Craighead a grant through which she completed work focused on images of God the Mother until her 1983 return to New Mexico.

=== New Mexico (1983–2019) ===
In May 1983, Craighead arrived in Albuquerque, New Mexico at Sagrada Art Studios, where she worked briefly before settling in a small house near the Rio Grande. Here her life of solitude flourished with a family of German Shorthaired Pointers who became key figures in her life. She was particularly close to the mother dog, Erdamir, whom she described as "the epiphany of the Great Goddess in [her] life." During this period, Craighead finished work on The Mother's Songs, which was published by Paulist Press in 1986, and began work on The Litany of the Great River. She worked with charcoal, scratchboard, paints, and watercolor. By this point, Craighead's art was becoming well known and eagerly sought in the United States.

Apart from her work as an artist, Craighead began lecturing and conducting workshops on the divine feminine across North America and also in Europe. In July 1995, Craighead launched "Praying with Images: Creative Retreats for Women," the first of several four-day gatherings held at a house she purchased with a neighbor near her own home in Albuquerque.

While living in Albuquerque, Craighead embarked on a number of pilgrimages, including international trips to Egypt, Mexico, Turkey, Spain, France, Greece, the Rhine Valley, Switzerland and, domestically, to the source of the Arkansas River.

In 2002, Amy Dosser began following Craighead for a number of years to film her workshops, seminars, and lectures. In 2003, Pomegranate Communications published a retrospective of her work titled Meinrad Craighead, Crow Mother and the Dog God: A Retrospective. In 2009, the Resource Center for Women and Ministry in the South and Minnow Media produced Praying with Images, an hour-long documentary about Craighead and her work.

== Artistic process ==
Craighead approached creating art as a spiritual endeavor and sacred practice through which to explore the unknown. She wrote, spoke and lectured on the connections between her own experiences, her art, and her spirituality. At workshops and retreats in Europe and the United States, Craighead invited participants into the creation of rituals and incorporation of spiritual practices into their daily lives. She asserted the importance of altars in her life and emphasized the interconnectedness of the material and spiritual realms. Author Anita McLeod reflected on her experience at one of Craighead's retreats in the Praying with Images documentary, noting that Craighead "touches in on a huge piece that's missing in much of organized religion... She brings the spirit back in. She brings in a sense of humor. She brings in this whole sense. She's a mystic." McLeod continued on to comment on "the way [Craighead] sees what's happening in the world and relates it to our spiritual lives."

In the publisher's note to Meinrad Craighead: Crow Mother and the Dog God: A Retrospective, Zoe Katherine Burke writes that Craighead's paintings "deliver us to thresholds and dare us to cross them, to see differently, to expand our vision of what's possible, to become humble in the face of our earthliness, to feel immeasurably blessed and empowered by the presence of animals in our lives, to trust in and respect the mystery of the unknown."

Craighead worked in a variety of mediums, including block prints, gesso relief prints, scratchboard, charcoal, painting, drawing and watercolor. Recurrent themes in Craighead's art include the divine feminine, motherhood, the Black Madonna, sacred animals, landscapes, and thresholds. German Romanticism, German Expressionism, Catholicism, ancient Egyptian and Greek religions, southwestern Native American spiritual traditions, dreams, and litanies influenced her work.

== Legacy ==
Meinrad Craighead died on April 8, 2019, at the age of 83.

Craighead left her unsold work and copyright to Amy Dosser who manages the Meinrad Craighead website, where videos and lectures are made available to the public.

== Publications ==
In 2003, Pomegranate Communications published Meinrad Craighead: Crow Mother and the Dog God: A Retrospective, which is a compilation of Craighead's life's work featuring essays from Rosemary Davies, Virginia Beane Rutter, and Eugenia Parry. In 2009, the Resource Center for Women and Ministry in the South and Minnow Media published the documentary Meinrad Craighead: Praying with Images.

Craighead's published works include:

- The Mother's Birds: Images for a Death and a Birth. Worcester, England: Stanbrook Abbey Press, 1976.
- The Sign of the Tree: Meditations in Images and Words. London: Artists House, 1979.
- "Immanent Mother." in The Feminist Mystic, and Other Essays on Women and Spirituality. Mary E. Giles. New York: Crossroad, 1982.
- The Mother's Songs: Images of God the Mother. New York: Paulist Press, 1986.
- Liturgical Art, Kansas City, MO: Sheed & Ward, 1988.
- The Litany of the Great River. New York: Paulist Press, 1991.

Meinrad Craighead is featured in the following publications:

- Swann, Donald. The Rope of Love: Around the Earth in Song. Bodley Head Children's Books, 1973. Illustrated by Meinrad Craighead.
- The Sunday Missal. Edited by Harold Winstone. London: Collins Liturgical Publications, 1975. Illustrated by Meinrad Craighead.
- The Weekday Missal. Edited by Harold Winstone. London: Collins Liturgical Publications, 1975. Illustrated by Meinrad Craighead.
- Winter, Miriam Therese. WomanWord: Women of the New Testament. New York: Crossroad Publishing Company, 1990. Illustrated by Meinrad Craighead.
- Winter, Miriam Therese. WomanWisdom: Women of the Hebrew Scriptures, Part One. New York: Crossroad Publishing Company, 1991. Illustrated by Meinrad Craighead.
- Winter, Miriam Therese. WomanWitness: Women of the Hebrew Scriptures, Part Two. New York: Crossroad Publishing Company, 1992. Illustrated by Meinrad Craighead.
- Ayo, Nicholas. Sacred Marriage: The Wisdom of the Song of Songs. Continuum, 1997. Illustrated by Meinrad Craighead.
- "Nel Giardino Segreto di Meinrad Craighead." ("In the Secret Garden of Meinrad Craighead.") A one-hour documentary, one episode of Il Filo d'Oro, 1998.
- Meinrad Craighead: Crow Mother and the Dog God: A Retrospective. Petaluma, CA: Pomegranate Communications, Inc., 2003.
