= Stevie Smith =

English poet and novelist (1902–1971)

- Smith in 1966
- Born: 20 September 1902; Kingston upon Hull, England
- Died: 7 March 1971 (aged 68); Ashburton, Devon, England
- Occupations: Poet; novelist

Florence Margaret Smith (20 September 1902 – 7 March 1971), known as Stevie Smith, was an English poet and novelist. She won the Cholmondeley Award and was awarded the Queen's Gold Medal for Poetry. Stevie, a play by Hugh Whitemore based on her life, was adapted into a film starring Glenda Jackson.

== Life ==
Stevie Smith, born Florence Margaret Smith at number 34 De La Pole Avenue in Kingston upon Hull, was the second daughter of Charles Ward Smith (1872–1949) and Ethel Rahel (1876–1919), daughter of a maritime engineer, John Spear. She was called "Peggy" within her family, but acquired the nickname "Stevie" as a young woman when she was riding in the park with a friend who said that she reminded him of the jockey Steve Donoghue.

Her father was a shipping agent, running a business that he had inherited from his father. As the company and his marriage both began to fall apart, he ran away to sea and Smith saw very little of him after that. He appeared occasionally on 24-hour shore leave and sent very brief postcards, one of which read, "Off to Valparaiso, Love Daddy."

When Stevie Smith was three years old she moved with her mother and sister to 1 Avondale Road, Palmers Green, London, where she lived until spending the last few months of her life in Ashburton Cottage Hospital. Later, when her mother became ill, her aunt Madge Spear, whom Smith called "The Lion Aunt", came to live with them, raised Smith and her elder sister Molly, and became the most important person in Smith's life. Spear was a feminist who claimed to have "no patience" with men and, as Smith wrote, "she also had 'no patience' with Hitler". Smith and Molly, raised in a family of women, became attached to their own independence, in contrast to what Smith described as the typical Victorian family atmosphere of "Father knows best."

When Smith was five she developed tuberculous peritonitis and was sent to a sanatorium near Broadstairs, Kent, where she remained for three years. She related that her preoccupation with death began when she was seven, at a time when she was very distressed at being sent away from her mother. Death and fear fascinated her, and provide the subjects of many of her poems. Her mother died when Smith was 16.

When she was suffering from the depression to which she was sporadically subject throughout her life Smith was so consoled by the thought of death as a release that, as she put it, she did not have to commit suicide. She wrote in several poems that death was "the only god who must come when he is called". Smith also suffered throughout her life from an acute nervousness, described as a mix of shyness and intense sensitivity.

In the poem "A House of Mercy" she wrote of her childhood house in North London:

It was a house of female habitation,
Two ladies fair inhabited the house,
And they were brave. For although Fear knocked loud
Upon the door, and said he must come in,
They did not let him in.

Smith was educated at Palmers Green High School, the North London Collegiate School for Girls, and Mrs Hoster's Secretarial College. She spent the remainder of her life with her aunt, and worked as private secretary to Sir Neville Pearson at Newnes Publishing Company in London from 1923 to 1953. She corresponded and socialised widely with other writers and creative artists, including Elisabeth Lutyens, Sally Chilver, Inez Holden, Naomi Mitchison, Isobel English and Anna Kallin.

After she retired from Sir Neville Pearson's service following a nervous breakdown, she gave poetry readings and broadcasts on the BBC that gained her new friends and readers among a younger generation. Sylvia Plath became a fan of her poems and sent Smith a letter in 1962, describing herself as "a desperate Smith-addict". Plath expressed interest in meeting in person, but took her own life soon after she sent the letter.

Smith was described by her friends as being naive and selfish in some ways but formidably intelligent in others, having been raised by her aunt as both a spoiled child and a resolutely autonomous woman. Likewise, her political views vacillated between her aunt's Toryism and her friends' left-wing tendencies. Smith was celibate for most of her life, although she rejected the idea that she was lonely as a result, alleging that she had a number of intimate relationships with friends and family that kept her fulfilled. She never entirely abandoned or accepted the High Church Anglican faith of her childhood, describing herself as a "lapsed atheist", and wrote sensitively about theological puzzles: "There is a God in whom I do not believe/Yet to this God my love stretches." Her 14-page essay of 1958, "The Necessity of Not Believing", concludes: "There is no reason to be sad, as some people are sad when they feel religion slipping off from them. There is no reason to be sad, it is a good thing." The essay was unveiled at a meeting of the Cambridge Humanist Society.

Smith died of a brain tumour on 7 March 1971. Her last collection, Scorpion and Other Poems, was published posthumously in 1972, and the Collected Poems followed in 1975. Her three novels were republished and there was a successful play based on her life, Stevie, written by Hugh Whitemore. It was filmed in 1978 by Robert Enders and starred Glenda Jackson and Mona Washbourne.

== Fiction ==
Smith wrote three novels, the first of which, Novel on Yellow Paper, was published in 1936. Apart from death, common subjects in her writing include loneliness; myth and legend; absurd vignettes, usually drawn from middle-class British life; war; human cruelty; and religion. All her novels are lightly fictionalised accounts of her own life, which got her into trouble at times as people recognised themselves. Smith said that two of the male characters in her last book are different aspects of George Orwell, who was close to Smith. There were rumours that they were lovers; he was married to his first wife at the time.

=== Novel on Yellow Paper (Cape, 1936) ===
Smith's first novel is structured as the random typings of a bored secretary, Pompey. She plays word games, retells stories from classical and popular culture, remembers events from her childhood, gossips about her friends and describes her family, particularly her beloved Aunt. As with all Smith's novels, there is an early scene where the heroine expresses feelings and beliefs for which she will later feel significant, although ambiguous, regret. In Novel on Yellow Paper that belief is anti-Semitism, where she feels elation at being the "only Goy" at a Jewish party. This apparently throwaway scene acts as a timebomb, which detonates at the centre of the novel when Pompey visits Germany as the Nazis are gaining power. With horror, she acknowledges the continuity between her feeling "Hurray for being a Goy" at the party and the madness that is overtaking Germany. The German scenes stand out in the novel, but perhaps equally powerful is her dissection of failed love. She describes two unsuccessful relationships, first with the German Karl and then with the suburban Freddy. The final section of the novel describes with unusual clarity the intense pain of her break-up with Freddy.

=== Over the Frontier (Cape, 1938) ===
Smith herself dismissed her second novel as a failed experiment, but its attempt to parody popular genre fiction to explore profound political issues now seems to anticipate post-modern fiction. If anti-Semitism was one of the key themes of Novel on Yellow Paper, Over the Frontier is concerned with militarism. In particular, she asks how the necessity of fighting Fascism can be achieved without descending into the nationalism and dehumanisation that fascism represents. After a failed romance the heroine, Pompey, suffers a breakdown and is sent to Germany to recuperate. At this point the novel changes style radically, as Pompey becomes part of an adventure/spy yarn in the style of John Buchan or Dornford Yates. As the novel becomes increasingly dreamlike, Pompey crosses over the frontier to become a spy and soldier. If her initial motives are idealistic, she becomes seduced by the intrigue and, ultimately, violence. The vision Smith offers is a bleak one: "Power and cruelty are the strengths of our lives, and only in their weakness is there love."

=== The Holiday (Chapman and Hall, 1949) ===
Smith's final novel was her own favourite, and is her most fully realised. It is concerned with personal and political malaise in the immediate post-war period. Most of the characters are employed in the army or the civil service in post-war reconstruction, and its heroine, Celia, works for the Ministry as a cryptographer and propagandist. The Holiday describes a series of hopeless relationships. Celia and her cousin Caz are in love, but cannot pursue their affair since it is believed that, because of their parents' adultery, they are half-brother and half-sister. Celia's other cousin Tom is in love with her, Basil is in love with Tom, Tom is estranged from his father, Celia's beloved Uncle Heber, who pines for a reconciliation; and Celia's best friend Tiny longs for the married Vera. These unhappy, futureless but intractable relationships are mirrored by the novel's political concerns. The unsustainability of the British Empire and the uncertainty over Britain's post-war role are constant themes, and many of the characters discuss their personal and political concerns as if they were seamlessly linked. Caz is on leave from Palestine and is deeply disillusioned, Tom goes mad during the war, and it is telling that the family scandal that blights Celia and Caz's lives took place in India. Just as Pompey's anti-Semitism is tested in Novel on Yellow Paper, so Celia's traditional nationalism and sentimental support for colonialism are challenged throughout The Holiday.

== Poetry ==
Smith's first volume of poetry, the self-illustrated A Good Time Was Had By All, was published in 1937 and established her as a poet. Smith said she took the title from parish magazines, where descriptions of church picnics often included this phrase.

Soon her poems were found in periodicals. Her style was often very dark; her characters were perpetually saying "goodbye" to their friends or welcoming death. At the same time her work has an eerie levity and can be very funny though it is neither light nor whimsical. For the critic Hermione Lee "Stevie Smith often uses the word 'peculiar' and it is the best word to describe her effects". She was never sentimental, undercutting any pathetic effects with the ruthless honesty of her humour.

Though her poems were remarkably consistent in tone and quality throughout her life, their subject matter changed over time, with less of the outrageous wit of her youth and more reflection on suffering, faith and the end of life. Her best-known poem is "Not Waving but Drowning". She was awarded the Cholmondeley Award for Poets in 1966 and won the Queen's Gold Medal for poetry in 1969. She published nine volumes of poems in her lifetime (three more were released posthumously).

As an occasional work, Smith wrote the text of the coffee-table book Cats in Colour (1959), for which she wrote a humorous series of captions to photographs imagining the inner lives of cats.

Smith's poems have been the focus of writers and critics around the world. James Antoniou writes in The Australian that her 'apparent innocence masks such fierce complexities, such ambition and startling originality, that many people baulk at her work', while Michael Dirda affirms in The Washington Post that, 'certainly, an outward charm is part of Smith's aesthetic strategy, though there’s nothing naive or whimsical beneath her surface.' Carol Rumens writes in The Guardian that Smith 'skewered formality, though formally deft, and challenged, with a Victorian school marm's brisk tartness, the lingering shades of late-Victorian social hypocrisy.'

In 2023, newly declassified UK government files revealed that Smith was considered as a candidate to be the new Poet Laureate of the United Kingdom in 1967 following the death of John Masefield. She was rejected after appointments secretary John Hewitt consulted with Dame Helen Gardner, the Merton Professor of English at the University of Oxford (who stated that Smith "wrote 'little girl poetry' about herself mostly") and Geoffrey Handley-Taylor, chair of The Poetry Society (who stated that Smith was "unstable").

== Works ==
=== Novels ===
- Novel on Yellow Paper (Cape, 1936)
- Over the Frontier (Cape 1938)
- The Holiday (Chapman and Hall, 1949)

=== Poetry collections ===
- A Good Time Was Had By All (Cape, 1937)
- Tender Only to One (Cape, 1938)
- Mother, What Is Man? (Cape, 1942)
- Alone in the Woods (Cape, 1947)
- Harold's Leap (Cape, 1950)
- Not Waving but Drowning (Deutsch, 1957)
- Selected Poems (Longmans, 1962) includes 17 previously unpublished poems
- The Frog Prince (Longmans, 1966) includes 69 previously unpublished poems
- The Best Beast (Longmans, 1969)
- Two in One (Longmans, 1971) reprint of Selected Poems and The Frog Prince
- Scorpion and Other Poems (Longmans, 1972)
- Collected Poems (Allen Lane, 1975)
- Selected Poems (Penguin, 1978)
- New Selected Poems of Stevie Smith (New Directions, 1988)
- Come on Come Back 1972
- The Collected Poems and Drawings of Stevie Smith (Faber and Faber, 2015)
- All the Poems of Stevie Smith (New Directions, 2016)

=== Other ===
- Some Are More Human Than Others: A Sketch-Book (Gaberbocchus Press, 1958)
- Cats in Colour (Batsford, 1959)
- Me Again: Uncollected Writings of Stevie Smith (Virago, 1984)
- "The Necessity of Not Believing" (Gemini No. 5, Spring 1958, Vol. 2, No. 1)
