= Mary Boulding =

British nun, theologian and translator (1929–2009)

Dame Mary Boulding OSB

Personal life
- Born: 3 May 1929 Wimbledon, Surrey, England
- Died: 11 November 2009 (aged 80) Wass, North Yorkshire, England
- Known for: Nun, writer and translator

Religious life
- Religion: Christianity
- Denomination: Roman Catholic Church
- Order: Order of Saint Benedict
- Monastic name: Ethelburga (1948–1968); Maria (1968 onwards)
- Profession: 1952 (solemn vows)

Mary Boulding (3 May 1929 – 11 November 2009) was a British nun, theologian, writer and translator.

The oldest of three daughters, she declined a scholarship to Lady Margaret Hall, Oxford, and went to Stanbrook Abbey to become a nun. Boulding took her solemn vows in April 1952 after expressing her wish to delay her profession of vows, but this was remedied by the abbess Elizabeth Sumner who challenged her to theological endeavors. Her first book was published in 1973, and she joined the theological commission of the English Benedictine Congregation in the late 1970s.

Boulding later undertook a six-month tour of the Holy Land, Australia, and Japan in preparation for the marking the fifteenth centenary of Benedict of Nursia's birth in 1980, where she addressed mixed audiences. She spent the years 1985 to 2004 living as a hermit before returning to Stanbrook in early 2004 and spending the final years of her life translating, revising, and travelling.

== Biography ==
=== Early life and career ===
Boulding was born on 3 May 1929 at 94 Kenilworth Avenue in Wimbledon in Surrey and was baptised as Mary. She was the oldest of three daughters of the Roman Catholic convert Reginald Boulding, who was an electrical engineer and radar specialist, and his second wife Josephine, née Branney. The death of Boulding's mother when she was sixteen made her responsible for her younger siblings. She excelled at Ursuline school but declined to take up a scholarship at Lady Margaret Hall, Oxford, and went to Stanbrook Abbey in Worcester in September 1947, to pursue her desire to become a nun. On 1 April 1948 she was clothed in the habit and given the religious name of Ethelburga. Boulding took her solemn vows in April 1952, when she was twenty-two years old. After this, she described herself as "intellectually frustrated, stagnant, unhappy," and expressed her desire to delay her vocation until later. This was attributed to Boulding having insufficient intellectual stimulation, and was remedied by the Abbess Elizabeth Sumner who recognised Boulding's abilities and channelled her into theology.

While an external student of the University of London, she became novice mistress in 1965. Although she occasionally faltered in the discernment of genuine vocations, Boulding was distinguished by the clarity and depth of her conferences and adopted an approach of 'both ... and’ rather than ‘either … or’. Boulding was a staunch supporter of renewal and openness in the post-Vatican II church of the 1960s. Around the same time she was given public speaking lessons by the actor Alec Guinness. She returned to using the name Maria in 1968. She appreciated the rediscovered scriptural focus of the council documents, and she resonated deeply with the church as servant and pilgrim. In 1973, she published her first book entitled Contemplative Nuns—Are They Wasting Their Lives?. Boulding retired as novice mistress in 1974 and was made sub-prioress. She joined the theological commission of the English Benedictine Congregation in the late 1970s and helped to produce a book about contemporary monastic life and similar topics called Consider Your Call (1978). Another book of Boulding's, Marked for Life: Prayer in the Easter Christ, was published in 1979.

During preparations for the marking of the fifteenth centenary of Benedict of Nursia's birth in 1980, she was invited to make a six-month conference tour which saw her speak to a variety of peoples in the Holy Land, Australia and Japan. Boulding experienced a minor earthquake during her visit to Japan and reflected that: "If I had only a few more minutes to live, I didn't want to waste them talking to God about my sins. I wanted to thank him for all the love, all the joy." Her third book was entitled The Coming of God, published in 1982. Another book came out that same year, A Touch of God, which consists of monastic journeys that Boulding edited. She was granted permission from the abbess to live as a hermit in January 1985, where she spent the years 1985 to 2004 in Pontrilas in Hertfordshire, along with her dog and cat, while she continued to work heavily. Another book, Gateway to Hope, followed in 1987. She translated St Augustine's Confessiones in 1996, receiving positive acclaim from Rowan Williams for its ‘different level of excellence’. Her translation of the six volumes Expositions of the Psalms between 2000 and 2004 made available the least known of St Augustine's works.

=== Last years and death ===
When she returned to Stanbrook for the final time in February 2004, Boulding was appointed librarian and supervised the transfer of more than 40,000 books in preparation for the community's moving to Wass in North Yorkshire. She said of the move: "Life goes on. It is not as if it is all a loss and grief and misery." Boulding then served a second term as sub-abbess from 2006 to 2008, and then abbess between 2008 and 2009. During this period she became a member of the Roman missal editorial committee and spent her final days translating, revising and travelling. Her work for the committee led to the Vatican appointing her to a committee to look over the prayers of the Liturgy of Hours in 2008. She was diagnosed with oesophageal cancer in Lent 2009 and refused most treatment apart from palliative measures. Three days before her death, she completed Journey to Easter, a series of meditations detailing her experiences of the Resurrection through pain and suffering. The book was published by Continuum posthumously. She died at the new Stanbrook on 11 November 2009, having insisted that no Latin be read at her funeral at Ampleforth Abbey.
