= Concealed Enemies =

1984 American PBS docudrama

Concealed Enemies is a 1984 American PBS docudrama, produced by WGBH-TV in Boston, about the events leading to the arrest, conviction and imprisonment of former U.S. State Department official Alger Hiss. Directed by Jeff Bleckner, written by Hugh Whitemore and starring Edward Herrmann as Hiss, John Harkins as Whittaker Chambers and Peter Riegert as Richard Nixon, the two-part miniseries won the 1984 Primetime Emmy Award for Outstanding Limited Series.

The title comes from August 25, 1948, known as "Confrontation Day," during which Whittaker Chambers stated:

The story has spread that in testifying against Mr. Hiss I am working out some old grudge, or motives of revenge or hatred. I do not hate Mr. Hiss. We were close friends, but we are caught in a tragedy of history. Mr. Hiss represents the concealed enemy against which we are all fighting, and I am fighting. I have testified against him with remorse and pity, but in a moment of history in which this Nation now stands, so help me God, I could not do otherwise.

Senator Joseph McCarthy paraphrased this phrase with his own: "the enemy within."

Goldcrest Films invested £558,000 in the film and received £545,000 causing them a loss of £13,000.
