= Felicitas Corrigan =

Dame Felicitas Corrigan OSB (6 March 1908 – 7 October 2003, Kathleen Corrigan) was a British Benedictine nun, author and humanitarian.

== Biography ==
Corrigan was born in Liverpool in 1908 to a large family. She learned to play the organ at an early age and by age 15 was working as an organist at a local church. She then won an organ scholarship from the Archdiocese of Liverpool. While studying Gregorian Chant at Stanbrook Abbey in Worcestershire, she met Dame Laurentia McLachan, who would later inspire Corrigan to become a nun. Corrigan read English at the University of Liverpool, delivering a dissertation on the poet Coventry Patmore.

In 1934, the 25 year-old Corrigan entered Stanbrook Abbey as a novice. She became a nun and eventually the Abbey choir director. One of her projects was to develop an English version of the office of Compline for the abbey.

Corrigan wrote the book The Nun, the Infidel, and the Superman (1985). It was about the friendships between McLachlan and George Bernard Shaw and the scholar Sir Sydney Cockerell. The book was adapted into The Best of Friends, a play by Hugh Whitemore that was staged in the West End of London. It also became a film for television starring Wendy Hiller. In the course of her career, Felicitas corresponded with poet Siegfried Sassoon, actor Alec Guinness; and novelist Rumer Godden.

Corrigan's biography of Helen Waddell was awarded the 1986 James Tait Black Memorial Prize. Corrigan also wrote about Hildegard of Bingen and edited publications for the Stanbrook Abbey Press. Her other works include:

- In a Great Tradition: Tribute to Dame Laurentia McLachlan, Abbess of Stanbrook (1956)
- George Thomas of Soho (1970)
- Siegfried Sassoon: Poet's Pilgrimage (1973)
- Benedictine Tapestry (1991)

Corrigan was Stanbrook Abbey's organist from 1933 until 1990. She died at Cheltenham on 7 October 2003.
