= Stevie (play) =

1977 play by Hugh Whitemore

Stevie is a 1977 play by Hugh Whitemore, about the life of poet Stevie Smith. The play's two-week, pre-London engagement was at the Theatre Royal, Brighton. The production opened March 23, 1977, at the Vaudeville Theatre with Glenda Jackson as English poet and novelist Stevie Smith and featured Mona Washbourne and Peter Eyre. It was directed by Clifford Williams.

The play received a film adaptation in 1978 directed by Robert Enders, with Glenda Jackson, Mona Washbourne, Alec McCowen and Trevor Howard.

== Plot ==
British poet/author Stevie Smith lives with her beloved aunt. Her life story is told through direct dialogue with the audience by Stevie, as well as flashbacks, and narration by a friend known as "The Man". The main focus is on her relationship with her aunt, romantic relationships of the past, including her boyfriend Freddie, and the fame she received late in her life. Stevie escapes her dull middle-class existence through her poetry. Though she takes many spiritual flights of fancy, she never truly leaves the suburban house wherein all the action takes place.

== Production history ==
The Manhattan Theater Club produced the play in 1979 with Roberta Maxwell, Margaret Hilton, and James Higgins. It was directed by Brian Murray

Cesear's Forum, Cleveland's minimalist theatre company, presented the play at Kennedy's Down Under, Playhouse Square in January/February 2003 with Sheila E. Maloney, Lee Mackey and John Kolibab. It was directed by Greg Cesear.

Minerva Theatre, Chichester presented the play in May 2014 with Zoe Wanamaker, Lynda Baron, and Chris Larkin. It was directed by Christopher Morahan. The production transferred to the Hampstead Theatre for a March/April run in 2015.
