= John Harkins (actor) =

American actor (1932–1999)

- Born: John Raymond Harkins; September 7, 1932; St. Louis, Missouri, U.S.
- Died: March 5, 1999 (aged 66); Portola Valley, California, U.S.
- Occupation: Actor
- Years active: 1955–1996
- Spouse: Lydia Ann Grenier (m. 1964)

John Raymond Harkins (September 7, 1932 – March 5, 1999) was an American stage, film, and television actor.

== Life and career ==
Born in St. Louis, Missouri, where he attended Normandy High School, Harkins began acting professionally in the mid-1950s on the Broadway stage after studying at the University of Iowa. A life member of The Actors Studio, Harkins appeared in productions of The Terrible Swift Sword, Good as Gold, and Mother Courage and Her Children, prior to making his television debut in a 1965 episode of The Trials of O'Brien. The next year, Harkins made his film debut in The Three Sisters, opposite Shelley Winters and Geraldine Page. From 1967 to 1970, he appeared in various roles on Dark Shadows, and appeared in guest roles on Harry O, and had roles in several television movies. In 1975, Harkins had a recurring role on the CBS sitcom Doc. He also appeared in "Chuckles Bites the Dust", a memorable episode of The Mary Tyler Moore Show, as the reverend.

During the 1980s, Harkins continued with roles in television and films appearing as a cynical lawyer in the 1981 thriller Absence of Malice, starring Paul Newman, an ill-fated real-estate agent in the 1983 horror film Amityville 3-D,1983 in The Return Of The Man From U.N.C.L.E[The Fifteen Years Later Affair] and former Communist and Cold War-era figure Whittaker Chambers in the 1984 PBS mini-series, Concealed Enemies. From 1985 to 1987, he portrayed Bruce Mansfield, a recurring character on Cagney & Lacey (he later reprised the role in the 1994 television reunion movie Cagney & Lacey: The Return). In 1988, Harkins co-starred in the television adaptation of Inherit the Wind starring Jason Robards and Kirk Douglas, followed by a role in Slaves of New York. One of Harkins' last onscreen appearances was in the 1996 HBO film Crime of the Century.

Harkins died on March 5, 1999, in Portola Valley, California.

== Filmography ==
Film
Year	Title	Role	Notes
1966	The Three Sisters	Fedotik	
1967	The Tiger Makes Out	Leo	
1969	Popi	Harmon	Uncredited
1976	Acapulco Gold	Morgan Frye	
1979	Being There	Courtney	Alternative title: Chance
1981	Absence of Malice	Davidek	
1982	Six Weeks	Arnold Stillman	
1983	Amityville 3-D	Clifford Sanders	
1984	Birdy	Major Weiss M.D.	
1987	Rampage	Dr. Keddie	
1989	Slaves of New York	Chuck Dade Dolger	
1992	Adventures in Spying	Paperboy	Alternative title: Operation Lookout
Television
Year	Title	Role	Notes
1967	Dark Shadows	Lieutenant Costa	1 episode
1969	Dark Shadows	Garth Blackwood, Mr. Strack	various episodes
1970	Dark Shadows	Horace Gladstone	various episodes
1972	Particular Men	Eggard	Television movie
1975	The Mary Tyler Moore Show	Reverend Burns	Episode: "Chuckles Bites the Dust"
1975	Phyllis	Mr. Carlson	Episode: Pilot
1976	Sara	Washburn	Episode: "Lady"
1976	Griffin and Phoenix	Dr. Glenn	Television movie
1977	Family	Bertrand Hammond	2 episodes
1978	All in the Family	Gordon Faraday	1 episode
1978	A Question of Love	Dr. Berwick	TV movie
1979	The Cracker Factory	Father Dunhill	Television movie
1980	Tenspeed and Brown Shoe	Beuler	1 episode
1980	Alice	Mr. Egan	1 episode
1981	Taxi	John Bowman	1 episode
1982	One Shoe Makes It Murder	Smiley Copell	Television movie
1983	The Winds of War	US Consul August Van Winaker II	Miniseries
1984	City Killer	Wally Rickvine	Television movie
1984	Concealed Enemies	Whittaker Chambers	Two-part miniseries (1984 Primetime Emmy)
1985	Moonlighting	Omar Gauss	1 episode
1985–1987	Cagney & Lacey	Brunce Mansfield	3 episodes
1986	Dream West	Secretary of State George Bancroft	Miniseries
1987	Sable	Thomas R. Waterston	1 episode
1988	The Golden Girls	Ham Lushbough	1 episode
1989	Hunter	Dr. Pence	1 episode
1990	Murder, She Wrote	Owen Brownwell	1 episode
1990	L.A. Law	Martin Lowens	1 episode
1990	Dallas	Control	4 episodes
1992	Matlock	Richard "Dick" Lerner	2 episodes
1993	The Boys	Harlan	6 episodes
1994	Picket Fences	Chief Justice Renquist	1 episode
1994	Cagney & Lacey: The Return	Mansfield	Television movie
1995	Pig Sty	Bolek	1 episode
1996	Crime of the Century	Edward Reilly	Television movie
