= Catherine Gascoigne =

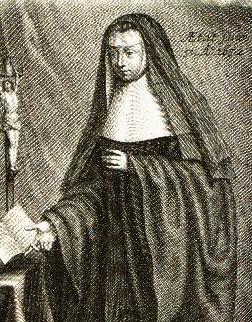
- in 1652
- Born: 1601; Yorkshire, England
- Died: 21 May 1676 (aged 74–75); Cambrai, France
- Known for: Abbess at Cambrai

Catherine Gascoigne (1601 – 21 May 1676) was the English abbess of Cambrai from 1624 to 1673.

== Life ==
Gascoigne was born in Barnbow, Yorkshire. Her parents were Lady Anne (born Ingelby of Lawkland Hall) and Sir John Gascoigne who was the first Baronet of Barnbow and Parlington Hall in Yorkshire. She was born into a Roman Catholic family with ancestors who included the judge William Gascoigne and the academic theologian Sir Thomas Gascoigne. The family were influenced by Richard Huddleston and many of her siblings entered a religious life. Her eldest brother, Sir Thomas, was accused of being involved in the Popish Plot, her sister Justina, was prioress of a convent at Paris and three of her brothers took religious orders including John (1598–1681) who became the abbot of the Benedictines at Lamspringe Abbey in Germany.

She made the final decision to become a nun after a disfiguring infection of smallpox and she went to Douai in search of a community. She arrived in time to join eight others who had decided to found a community at Cambrai in France led by Gertrude More. They were led initially by three nuns from Brussels and a monk named Augustine Baker. Baker had prescriptive advice about how the nuns should proceed which Gascoigne accepted, but Gertrude More struggled with his idea. She would take some time to persuade.

She was elected to be the abbess at Cambrai in 1624 and she continued to be re-elected every four years by the community. Baker's approach led to him being recalled to Douai and in 1633 the General Chapter of the English Benedictine Congregation considered all the texts that were being used at Cambrai. Both More and Gascoigne wrote letters in support of Baker's approach and the General Chapter found no issue. Sister More died that year.

In 1651 a small number of nuns were sent to Paris in search of benefactors, although the nuns who left also reduced the need for food at Cambrai. The nuns were led by Bridget More (Gertrude's sister) and in 1652 she was elected Prioress. This group was recognised as a separate community by the Paris Chapter in 1653 although the nuns wished to remain within the English Benedictine Congregation.

In 1655 the English Benedictine Congregation moved again to try and censure the use of Augustine Baker's approach. Gascoigne refused to cooperate and would not send them the papers they required for the investigation. She threatened that she would leave the EBC if they insisted on her cooperation. The investigation ceased.

== Death and legacy ==
Gascoigne resigned as abbess in 1673 and she died at the convent in Cambrai in 1676. The community founded at Cambrai still exists today as Stanbrook Abbey. The Paris community became the St Mary's Abbey, Colwich community and they rejoined after more than 360 years apart. The community in Cambrai had led by Gascoigne would lead to other communities in Australia, Argentina, Brazil, Canada, Chile, France, Nigeria, USA, Uruguay and the UK.
