= Werburg Welch =

English painter

Dame Werburg Welch, OSB (1894–1990), born Eileen Welch, was an English artist and Benedictine nun. Born in Cheltenham, her father was a Catholic convert who sent her to convent schools. She studied art at both Southampton and Bristol before becoming a nun and continued her art work.

== Biography ==
Grace Eileen Welch was born on 17 May 1894 in Cheltenham and known as Eileen until she entered religious life. Her father was John Grindon Welch, and her mother, Grace Mary Welch, had four children, of whom Eileen was the eldest.

John Welch had been raised Protestant but converted to Catholicism after reading Cardinal Newman's works. Eileen was sent to Holy Trinity School, Kidderminster, shortly after it was founded, a school run by nuns exiled from France. In 1906, Eileen and her sister were sent to be educated at Convent of the Cross. She went on to study at Southampton School of Art and then at the Bristol Art School, when the family settled in Bristol.

In 1913, Eileen entered the Convent of the Religious of the Cross as a postulant, before becoming a novice at Stanbrook Abbey in Worcestershire in 1915, supposedly wearing a fashionable skirt too tight to kneel in. There, she took the religious name Werburg.

On 30 November 1919, she took her solemn vows and became Dame Werburg, a full Benedictine nun. She intended to give up art but was persuaded to carry on. Welch continued to study art under Desmond Chute and Eric Gill, from whom she derived her angular style.

During the Second World War, she took on the role of managing orchards and became an expert on fruit trees, a hobby she carried on until her 80s. She was a sub-prioress of Stanbrook Abbey from 1956 until 1968. She suffered a severe stroke in November 1989 and died on February 1, 1990, at Stanbrook Abbey.

== Works ==
Welch was known for her designs of liturgical furnishings and took a lead role in the 1929 Catholic Times' Arts and Crafts exhibition. Her paintings and wood carvings can be found in many Catholic and Anglican churches in Britain, including Farnborough Abbey (Weston-super-Mare) and the University of Birmingham's Catholic Chapel.

She regularly exhibited in the 1930s and 1940s with the Guild of Catholic Artists and Craftsmen, using the assumed name of Benedictine of Stanbrook. Her works have appeared in Art Notes and L'Artisan Liturgique. Her best-known work was a commission piece called The Praying Christ.

A retrospective of her work was held at Ushaw in 2019.
