= Gertrude More =

English nun (1606 - 1633)

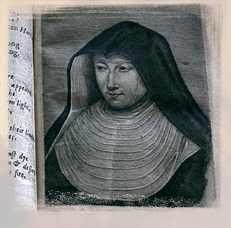
Dame Gertrude More.

Dame Gertrude More O.S.B (born as Helen More; 25 March 1606–17 August 1633) was a nun of the English Benedictine Congregation, a writer and one of the founding group of Stanbrook Abbey.

== Life ==
More was born in Low Leyton in Essex. Her father, Cresacre More, was great-grandson of Thomas More; her mother, Elizabeth Gage, was sister of Sir John Gage, 1st Baronet of Firle, Sussex, Lord Chamberlain to Queen Mary. Her mother died in 1611 and Helen's father, who had trained to be a monk, became responsible for her care and education. Dom Benet Jones, a Benedictine monk, encouraged her to join his projected religious foundation, Our Lady of Comfort, in Cambrai. She was the first of nine postulants admitted to the order on 31 December 1623. Helen More came under the prescriptive influence of the Benedictine Augustine Baker and took the religious name of Gertrude. She brought to the new organisation her lineage as the great-great-granddaughter of the Catholic martyr Thomas More, her education and a large dowry from her father that would fund the convent's creation.

Catherine Gascoigne, one of her peers, was chosen ahead of her by the authorities in Rome as abbess in 1629 because she was older. Gascoigne was more welcoming of Baker's advice. Sister More opposed Baker's approach but eventually gave into his ways - which included writing good books.

Her writing was heavily influenced by Christian mystics such as Julian of Norwich and Teresa of Avila and other spiritual writers and she contributed to the effort to publish their work.

The row at Cumbrai continued and Baker was recalled to Douai. Before the row was settled Gertrude died at Cambrai, from smallpox, aged 27.

== Posthumous ==
Some papers found after her death and arranged by Father Baker were afterwards published in two separate works: one entitled The Holy Practices of a Divine Lover, or the Sainctly Ideot's Devotions (Paris, 1657); the other, Confessiones Amantis, or Spiritual Exercises, or Ideot's Devotions, to which was prefixed her Apology, for herself and for her spiritual guide (Paris, 1658).
