= Barbara Constable =

Barbara Constable (1617–1684), professed as Dame Barbara Constable, was an English Benedictine nun, writer and transcriber. Her writing was a support to recusant Catholic communities and some of her transcriptions are the only known copies of Father Augustine Baker's works.

== Early life ==
Constable, born in 1617, was one of the daughters of Sir Philip Constable, 1st Baronet and Anne Roper; Sir Philip was a baronet in the East Riding of Yorkshire, England. Barbara Constable and her family were Roman Catholics.

== Religious life ==
Constable arrived in 1638 at the monastery of Our Lady of Consolation in Cambrai, France, which had been founded in the 1620s; she died there in 1684. Her poor health made contemplative prayer more difficult so she wrote copiously as part of her religious practice.

== Writing ==
Constable wrote and compiled devotional writing collections as well as transcribing the writings of Father Augustine Baker, spiritual director at Cambrai from 1624 to 1633 Her writing work at the monastery, which included translations and transcriptions of spiritual works, was intended for fellow religious, laypeople, and for Catholics experiencing difficulty in prayer. One of her works on authority, 'Speculum Superiorum', contained advice on the treatment of nuns by their spiritual superiors and emphasised union and peace. Some of her transcriptions of Baker's writings are the only known copies.

The transcribing, copying, preservation and distribution of Catholic religious works by women like Constable was a support to recusant English Catholic communities during the 16th and 17th centuries.
