= The Boys (1993 TV series) =

- Genre: Sitcom
- Created by: Dan O'Shannon
- Starring: Christopher Meloni; Isabella Hofmann; Ned Beatty; Doris Roberts; John Harkins
- Composer: Jonathan Wolff
- Country of origin: United States
- Original language: English
- No. of seasons: 1
- No. of episodes: 6 (1 unaired)

Production
- Executive producer: Dan O'Shannon
- Camera setup: Multi-camera
- Running time: 30 minutes
- Production companies: Hughes O'Shannon Productions; CBS Productions

Original release
- Network: CBS
- Release: August 20 – September 17, 1993

The Boys is an American sitcom television series that aired on CBS from August 20 until September 17, 1993.

== Premise ==
A horror novelist moves into a house and starts hanging out with the friends of the man who recently died there.

== Cast ==
- Christopher Meloni as Doug Kirkfield
- Ned Beatty as Bert
- Richard Venture as Al
- John Harkins as Harlan
- Doris Roberts as Doris
- Isabella Hofmann as Molly

== Episodes ==
No.	Title	Directed by	Written by	Original release date
1	"Don't Call Me Ed"	Terry Hughes	Dan O'Shannon	August 20, 1993
Doug buys an old house and befriends the friends of the recently deceased man who used to live there.
2	"Ladies' Night"	Terry Hughes	Dan O'Shannon	August 27, 1993
Doris spends an evening with Molly and it changes how she views her marriage to Bert.
3	"Strike One, You're Out"	Terry Hughes	Dan O'Shannon	September 3, 1993
Doug puts Bert in the hospital after a dare gone wrong.
4	"The Writing Class"	Terry Hughes	Dan O'Shannon	September 10, 1993
Doug finds out that Bert writes like Hemingway.
5	"95 in the Shade"	Terry Hughes	Dan O'Shannon and Clay Graham	September 17, 1993
It's the middle of summer and a neighbor still has all his Christmas lights up.
6	"The Wicker Moosehead"	Terry Hughes	Dan Staley	Unaired
