= Hugh Whitemore =

English playwright and screenwriter (1936–2018)

Hugh Whitemore FRSL
- Born: Hugh John Whitemore; 16 June 1936; Tunbridge Wells, United Kingdom
- Died: 17 July 2018 (aged 82); London, United Kingdom
- Education: King Edward VI School
- Alma mater: Royal Academy of Dramatic Art
- Occupations: Playwright; screenwriter
- Years active: 1962–2009
- Known for: Breaking the Code (1986); Pack of Lies (1983); Stevie (1977); The Gathering Storm (2002)
- Spouses: Jill Brooke (divorced); Sheila Lemon (divorced); Rohan McCullough (m. 1998–2018)
- Awards: Emmy Award; Writers' Guild of Great Britain

Hugh John Whitemore (16 June 1936 – 17 July 2018) was an English playwright and screenwriter. His major stage plays included Breaking the Code (1986), about the mathematician and codebreaker Alan Turing, Pack of Lies (1983), based on a Cold War espionage case, and Stevie (1977), a portrait of the poet Stevie Smith, and The Best of Friends (1987), about the friendship Dame Laurentia McLachlan, the Abbess of Stanbrook Abbey, shared with George Bernard Shaw and Sydney Cockerell.

For television, he wrote The Gathering Storm (2002) and Concealed Enemies (1984), and My House in Umbria (2003), an adaptation of the William Trevor novella starring Maggie Smith, the first two of which won him an Emmy Award.

== Early life and education ==
Born at Tunbridge Wells, Kent, son of Samuel George Whitemore (1907-1987), a clerk at an oil company, and Kathleen Alma, née Fletcher. Whitemore studied for the stage at London's Royal Academy of Dramatic Art, where he was taught by Peter Barkworth, then on the staff at RADA, who recognised he had the potential to make a significant contribution to the theatre, though perhaps not as an actor.

== Career ==
He began his writing career in British television with both original television plays and adaptations of classic works by Charles Dickens, W. Somerset Maugham, Daphne du Maurier, and Charlotte Brontë, among others, and had won a Writers' Guild of Great Britain award twice. His work for American TV includes Concealed Enemies (1984), about the Alger Hiss case, and The Gathering Storm (2002), which focused on a troubled period in the marriage of Clementine and Winston Churchill just prior to World War II. He won an Emmy Award for each script. He was also nominated for his adaptation of the Carl Bernstein/Bob Woodward book about President Nixon, The Final Days starring Lane Smith as Nixon. Whitemore's last work for television was My House in Umbria (2003), an adaptation of the novella by William Trevor starring Maggie Smith. He also wrote the episode, "Horrible Conspiracies", for the BBC series Elizabeth R (1971).

Whitemore's film credits include: Man at the Top (1973), All Creatures Great and Small (1975), The Blue Bird (1976), The Return of the Soldier (1982), 84 Charing Cross Road (1987) and Utz (1992).

The plots of Whitemore's plays frequently focus on historical figures. Stevie (1977) centred on the life of English poet and novelist Stevie Smith and Pack of Lies (1983) covered events leading up to the arrest of the Krogers, two Americans spying for the Russians in London in 1961. Whitemore's best known work taking the form of a staged biography was Breaking the Code (1986) which was centered on Alan Turing, who was responsible for cracking the German Enigma code during World War II and resisted an adherence to the English code of sexual discretion with his homosexuality, for which he was charged with gross indecency. A television adaptation was broadcast in the UK in 1996. The Best of Friends (1987), about the friendship Dame Laurentia McLachlan, the Abbess of Stanbrook Abbey in Worcestershire, shared with George Bernard Shaw and Sydney Cockerell, director of the Fitzwilliam Museum in Cambridge. An adaptation by Whitemore of the Luigi Pirandello play As You Desire Me was staged at London's Playhouse Theatre in 2005 with Kristin Scott Thomas in the lead.

Whitemore was a Fellow of the Royal Society of Literature. He died at the age of 82 on 17 July 2018.

== Selected works ==
=== Stage ===
Year	Title	Notes
1977	Stevie	Based on the life of poet Stevie Smith
1983	Pack of Lies	Based on the Portland Spy Ring case; starred Judi Dench
1984	Sand in the Sandwiches	About the poet John Betjeman
1986	Breaking the Code	About mathematician Alan Turing; starred Derek Jacobi
1987	The Best of Friends	About the friendship of George Bernard Shaw, Sydney Cockerell and Dame Laurentia McLachlan; starred John Gielgud
1991	It's Ralph	Starred Timothy West
1997	A Letter of Resignation	About Harold Macmillan; starred Edward Fox
1998	Disposing of the Body	
2000	God Only Knows	Starred Derek Jacobi
2005	As You Desire Me	Adaptation of the Luigi Pirandello play; starred Kristin Scott Thomas
2008	The Last Cigarette	Co-written with Simon Gray; based on Gray's diaries
2012	A Marvellous Year for Plums	About the Suez Crisis

=== Television ===
Year	Title	Notes
1971	Elizabeth R	Episode: "Horrible Conspiracies"
1971	Cider with Rosie	Adaptation of Laurie Lee's memoir; BBC
1974	David Copperfield	Adaptation of the Charles Dickens novel; BBC
1975	Moll Flanders	Adaptation of the Daniel Defoe novel; BBC
1983	My Cousin Rachel	Adaptation of the Daphne du Maurier novel; BBC
1984	Concealed Enemies	About the Alger Hiss case; won Emmy Award
1997	A Dance to the Music of Time	Adaptation of the Anthony Powell novels; Channel 4
2002	The Gathering Storm	About Winston and Clementine Churchill; starred Albert Finney; won Emmy Award
2003	My House in Umbria	Adaptation of the William Trevor novella; starred Maggie Smith; nominated for Emmy Award
2009	Into the Storm	About Winston Churchill; starred Brendan Gleeson; nominated for Emmy Award

=== Film ===
Year	Title	Notes
1968	Decline and Fall...of a Birdwatcher	Additional scenes; adaptation of Evelyn Waugh
1973	Man at the Top	Adaptation of John Braine's novel
1976	The Blue Bird	Adaptation of the Maurice Maeterlinck play; starred Elizabeth Taylor
1982	The Return of the Soldier	Adaptation of the Rebecca West novel; starred Alan Bates and Julie Christie
1987	84 Charing Cross Road	Starred Anne Bancroft and Anthony Hopkins; won USC Scripter Award
1992	Utz	Adaptation of the Bruce Chatwin novel
1996	Jane Eyre	Co-written with Franco Zeffirelli; adaptation of the Charlotte Brontë novel
