= Hildelith Cumming =

British nun and musician (1909–1991)

Hildelith Cumming in 1976.

Dame Hildelith Cumming (1909 – 1991), born Barbara Theresa Cumming, was a British nun, printer and musician. Cumming converted to Roman Catholicism about the age of 30, joining Stanbrook Abbey, Worcestershire. There she took over management of the printing press for many years.

== Biography ==
Cumming was born in Battersea on 15 December 1909. Her father, Frederick Mann Cumming, was a civil engineer's assistant and her mother was Emma Georgina Love. She attended school in Clapham, before studying at the Royal Academy of Music. There she also gained teaching qualifications and was appointed a piano sub-professor in 1932, however, she moved on within a year to Wentworth's Collegiate School for Girls

Around 1930, Cumming joined the Oxford Group, falling in love with one of the members, but was not given permission to marry by the group's leader. In 1940, the Collegiate School was evacuated to Llangollen, where she converted to Roman Catholicism. On 18 December 1941, she took her vows as a Benedictine nun at Stanbrook Abbey, Worcestershire. She took the name Hildelith and would remain attached to the abbey for the remainder of her life. Cumming took on a number of musical roles within the abbey, including assistant organist, director of choir and director of music. While at the abbey, she was bestowed the Benedictine honorific title of "Dame".

Cumming took over management of the Stanbrook Abbey Press in 1952, after the press was recommended for closure. She was taught the art of printing by John Dreyfus and Jan van Krimpen and became renowned for her book designs and printing. In 1976, the press celebrated its centenary, being referred to as one of the oldest functioning private printing presses in the country.

She retired from printing projects in 1982, after suffering a heart attack and deteriorating health. Cumming died on 19 April 1991.
