= Laurentia McLachlan =

British abbess (1866–1953)

Dame Laurentia McLachlan
- Born: Margaret McLachlan; 11 January 1866; Coatbridge, Scotland, British Empire
- Died: 23 August 1953 (aged 87); Wass, England, United Kingdom
- Occupation: Benedictine nun
- Known for: Abbess of Stanbrook Abbey

Dame Laurentia McLachlan, OSB, née Margaret McLachlan, (11 January 1866 – 23 August 1953) was a Scottish Benedictine nun, Abbess of Stanbrook Abbey, and an authority on church music. She became posthumously known to a wide public when portrayed on the stage in a 1988 play, The Best of Friends.

== Life and work ==
McLachlan was born in Coatbridge, Lanarkshire, Scotland, the youngest of seven children of Henry McLachlan, an accountant, and his wife, Mary née McAleese. In 1884, she joined the Benedictine abbey at Stanbrook Abbey. In 1931, she was elected abbess of Stanbrook. Dame Laurentia, as she became known, served the wider Benedictine community as a member of the commission, set up that same year with the aim of modernising the various constitutions that governed the conditions of monastic life for women in England.

She was a pioneer in the restoration of the Gregorian chant in England and a leading authority on music and medieval manuscripts. In 1934, her work was recognised by Pope Pius XI who bestowed on her the Benemerenti medal for her contribution to Church music.

Dame Laurentia died in 1953 at Stanbrook Abbey, having spent seventy of her 87 years within the enclosed monastery. She was one of five figures chosen to represent one thousand years of "the inspired Christian life" at Worcester Cathedral's "Window of the Millennium". A 1988 stage play by Hugh Whitemore, The Best of Friends (based on a book entitled: The Nun, the Infidel and the Superman by Dame Felicitas Corrigan), provides a window on the friendship of McLachlan with Sir Sydney Cockerell and Bernard Shaw through adaptations from their letters and writings. McLachlan was first played by Rosemary Harris; in a 2006 revival at the Hampstead Theatre, Patricia Routledge played the part. In the 1991 television adaptation of The Best of Friends, she was portrayed by Dame Wendy Hiller.
