= Augustine Baker =

Welsh writer and mystic (1575–1641)

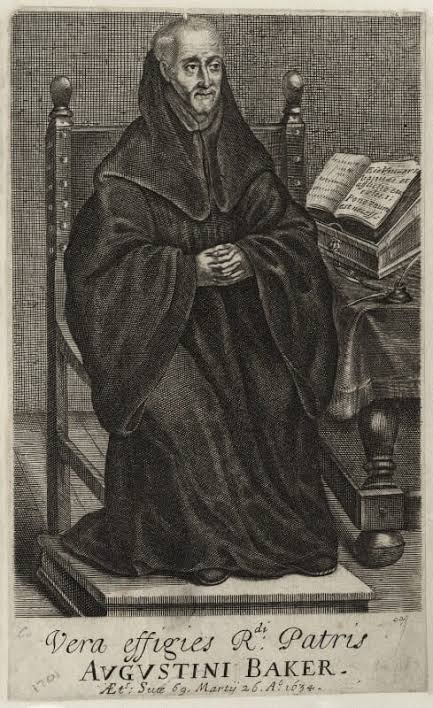
- Portrait of Augustine Baker
- Born: David Baker; 9 December 1575; Abergavenny, Wales
- Died: August 9, 1641 (aged 65); London, United Kingdom

Augustine Baker OSB (9 December 1575 – 9 August 1641), also sometimes known as Austin Baker, was a well-known Welsh Benedictine mystic and an ascetic writer. He was one of the earliest members of the English Benedictine Congregation, which was newly restored to England after the Reformation.

== Early life ==
Baker was born David Baker at Abergavenny, Monmouthshire, Wales on 9 December 1575. His father was William Baker, steward to Baron Abergavenny, and his mother was a daughter of Lewis ap John (alias Wallis), a Welsh vicar of Abergavenny. His parents were "church papists", meaning that although outwardly they conformed to Anglican worship, they remained Catholic by conviction. His sister, Margaret, was fined for recusancy in 1608; she was the grandmother of the martyr David Lewis.

He was educated at Christ's Hospital and at Broadgate's Hall, now Pembroke College, Oxford, afterwards becoming a member of Clifford's Inn, and later of the Middle Temple. In 1598 he was made Recorder of Abergavenny.

At Oxford he lost his faith in the existence of God, but after some years, his, to his mind, miraculous escape from a near fatal accident caused him to reconsider. He read widely the proscribed literature of the day, Anglican and Catholic. Following this, he was received into the Catholic Church.

== Career ==
In 1605 he joined the Benedictine Order at the Abbey of Santa Giustina in Padua, taking the religious name "Augustine", but ill health obliged him to postpone his religious profession, and he returned home to find his father on the point of death. Having reconciled him to the Catholic Church and assisted him in his last moments, Baker hastened to settle his own worldly affairs and to return to the cloister. He was professed by the Italian Fathers in England as a member of the Cassinese Congregation, but subsequently aggregated to the English Congregation.

He was ordained priest at Rheims in 1613 and sent to England. At the desire of his superiors he now devoted his time and the ample means which he had inherited, to investigating and refuting the recently started error that the ancient Benedictine congregation in England was dependent on that of Cluny, founded in 910. He used the Cottonian Library, which contained many works from Benedictine monasteries in England, placed at his disposal. In collaboration with Jones and Clement Reyner he wrote up his research in Apostolatus Benedictorum in Anglia. At Sir Robert Cotton's, Baker came in contact with the antiquary William Camden and with other learned men of his day.

In 1624 he was sent to the newly established convent of Benedictine nuns at Cambrai (today succeeded by the community at Stanbrook Abbey) in Flanders, not as chaplain, but to aid in forming the spiritual character of the religious. Here he remained for about nine years, during which time he wrote many of his mystical treatises, an abstract of which is contained in the work Sancta Sophia (1657) compiled by Serenus de Cressy. Some of the transcriptions of his works by the Cambrai nun Barbara Constable are the only known copies. In 1633 he removed to St Gregory's at Douai, where he wrote his long treatise on the English mission. The English Benedictine Congregation investigated the use of Baker's ideas at the convent in Cambrai. Catherine Gascoigne, the abbess, and Gertrude More, the founder, stepped up in his defence and no further action was taken.

In 1655 the English Benedictine Congregation moved again to try and censure the use of Augustine Baker's approach. Gascoigne refused to cooperate and would not send them the papers they required for the investigation. She threatened that she would leave the EBC if they insisted on her cooperation. The investigation ceased.

In 1638 he returned to the English mission, where he was frequently forced to change where he stayed in order to avoid the authorities who were on his track.

== Death ==
Baker died from the bubonic plague in London at the age of 65. He was buried at St Andrew's in Holborn.

== Legacy ==
Of more than thirty treatises chiefly on spiritual matters written by Baker, many are to be found in manuscript at Downside Abbey, Ampleforth Abbey, Stanbrook Abbey, and other Benedictine monasteries in England.

Abbot Justin McCann, former Master of St Benet's Hall, Oxford and titular abbot of Westminster from 1947, was an interpreter of Baker.

== Writings ==
- Sancta Sophia ("Holy Wisdom", 1657) compiled and edited by Serenus Cressy

== Bibliography ==
- Temple, Liam P. (2017). "The Mysticism of Augustine Baker, OSB: a reconsideration". Reformation & Renaissance Review. 19 (3): 213–230.
