= Don Corleone =

Don Corleone may refer to:

- Vito Corleone, the original Don in The Godfather, played by Marlon Brando and Robert De Niro
- Michael Corleone, Vito's son, played by Al Pacino, who took over the control of the family
- Vincent Corleone, Sonny's illegitimate son, played by Andy Garcia, who became Michael's successor and the third Don Corleone

== See also ==
- Don Corleon (born 1978), Jamaican record producer, songwriter, and mixer
