= Stanbrook Abbey =

Monastery in North Yorkshire, England

- Monastery of Our Lady of Consolation
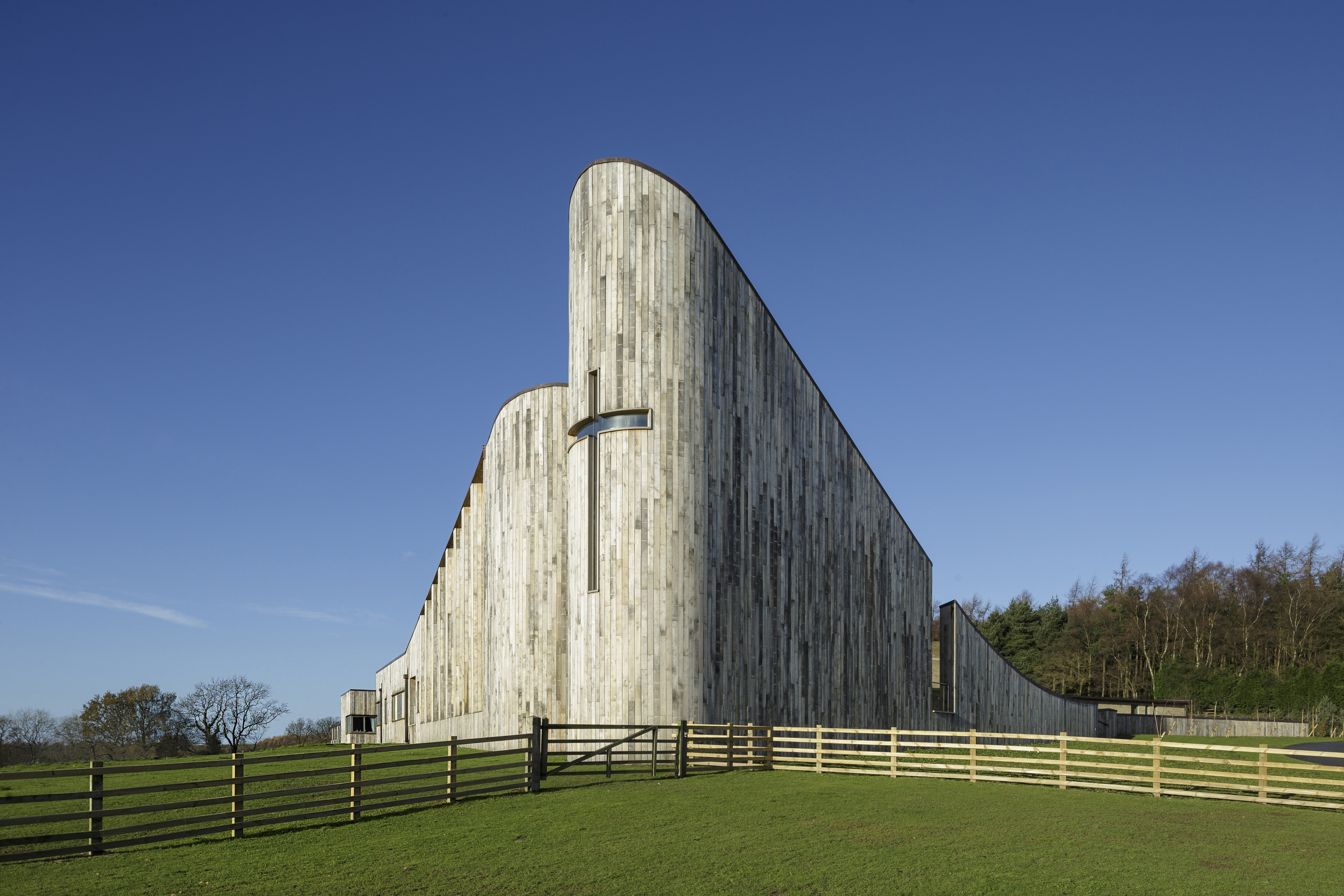
- Stanbrook Abbey Church in Wass, North Yorkshire
- Formation: 1625; 401 years ago
- Founder: Helen More et al.
- Founded at: Cambrai Abbey
- Type: Catholic religious order
- Main organ: Communio Internationalis Benedictinarum (CIB)
- Parent organization: Catholic Church
- Website: www.stanbrookabbey.org.uk

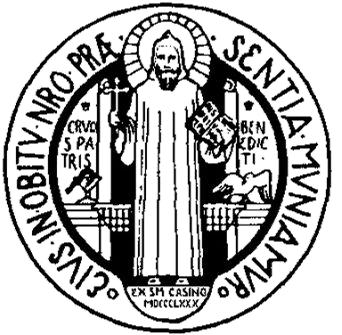
Saint Benedict

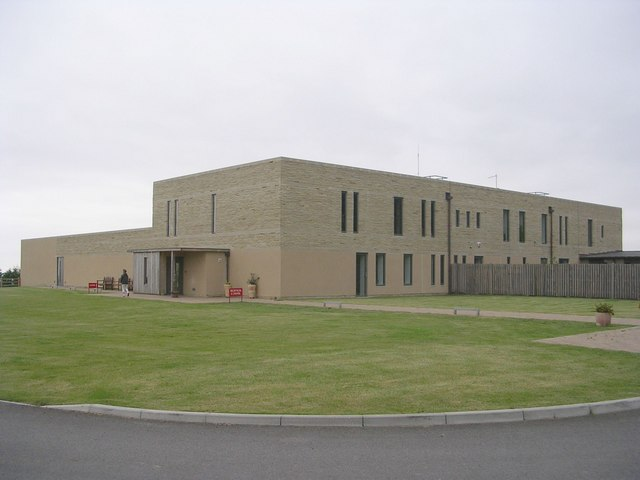
Stanbrook Abbey, Wass, North Yorkshire

Stanbrook Abbey is a Benedictine abbey in Wass, North Yorkshire, England. The Roman Catholic community was founded in 1625 at Cambrai in Flanders (then part of the Spanish Netherlands, now in France), under the auspices of the English Benedictine Congregation. After being imprisoned during the French Revolution, the surviving nuns fled to England and in 1838 settled at Stanbrook, Callow End, Worcestershire, where a new abbey was built. With the steep contemporary decline in monastic life, the community left their Grade II-listed property, to relocate to Wass in the North York Moors National Park in 2009. Following refurbishment, the former Worcestershire monastic estate has been operated as a luxury hotel since 2015.

== History ==
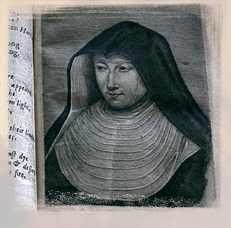
Dame Gertrude More

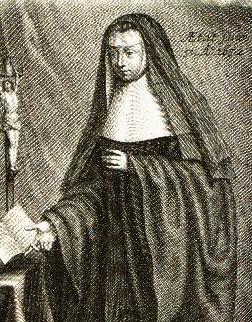
Dame Catherine Gascoigne

=== Foundation ===
The future abbey was founded in 1623 at Cambrai as the monastery of "Our Lady of Consolation", catering for English Catholic expatriates. The project was initiated in 1621 by an English Benedictine (EBC) monk called Benet Jones, who had been in contact with several interested young women in England while on mission duties there.

The nine original members were escorted by him from England to Cambrai (which the English then called Camerick), where they took over the ruined town-house of the defunct Benedictine abbey of Saint-Étienne-de-Fémy, restored it and moved in at the end of 1623. Since they were still laywomen they had to serve a noviciate, so three nuns from the English monastery at Brussels were lent to provide the formation. Two of them later joined the nascent community, including Dame Frances Gawen who served as the first superior. The monastery was only considered to have been formally founded when the noviciate was completed and the novices made vows, at the start of 1625.

The most notable among the foundresses was 17-year-old Helen More, professed as Dame Gertrude More, who was the great-great-granddaughter of St Thomas More; her father, Cresacre More, provided the original endowment for the foundation of the convent. Solemnly professed Benedictine nuns of the English tradition use the honorific "Dame" in the same way that EBC monks are called "Dom", (not to be confused with the lay title, Dames Commander of the Order of the British Empire). In the same tradition, abbesses used to be referred to as "Lady" which echoed the noble status of abbots and abbesses in pre-Reformation England.

The English Benedictine mystical writer Augustine Baker trained the young nuns in a tradition of contemplative prayer which survives to date.

The other eight foundresses were: Catherine Gascoigne, Grace and Ann More (cousins of Dame Gertrude), Anne Morgan, Margaret Vavasour, Frances Watson – these were choir nuns; and two claustral or extern sisters, Mary Hoskins and Jane Martin. The latter were not bound to the Divine Office or to keep monastic enclosure, so were responsible for shopping and for routine contacts with the outside world.

=== Life at Cambrai ===
The first abbess was elected in 1629. Lady Abbess Catherine Gascoigne was to serve for forty years, being re-elected every four years as is the peculiar English Benedictine custom (Benedictine abbots and abbesses are traditionally elected for life) She had to obtain a papal dispensation when first elected, as at age twenty-eight she was below the statutory age of thirty. The community members were very young then.

A daughter house in Paris was founded in 1651, which became independent in 1656 and was eventually to become Colwich Abbey in England. The two communities were to come together again in 2020, 364 years later.

The nuns were in Cambrai for 170 years, but little is known of their history because of subsequent destruction of records. However, the community had a good reputation for strictness of observance and for keeping enclosure. One oddity was that they ran a small school for girls inside their enclosure, with the pupils being subject to the monastic routine. As well as school fees, the sisters did the traditional remunerative work of enclosed nuns which is fine needlework and embroidery, especially on vestments and liturgical textiles. One unusual source of income was from fine paperwork, which involved cutting sheets of paper into complicated patterns and figurative depictions for decorative purposes. The nuns also had active intellectual lives, for example in translating French spiritual writings into English. A good library was accumulated.

A report preserved in the city archives has this:

The situation of the house of these English ladies (French: Dames) is healthy and sufficiently commodious, but not spacious. The buildings are very simple and close together, made of brick. Their church is extremely small but particularly neat and seemly, and there the Divine Office is solemnly celebrated in an edifying manner. The nuns are very observant of their Rule.

Despite the cramped site, the nuns had their own cemetery. Since they were under the authority of the Abbot President of the English Benedictine Congregation and not that of the bishop, they had no right of burial at the local parish church.

The nuns became French subjects in 1678 when Cambrai was annexed by France.

A memory of the monastery is preserved at Cambrai in the street name Rue des Anglaises, or "Englishwomen's Street".

=== Imprisonment and exile ===
In 1793, during the French Revolution, twenty-one of the nuns were arrested and evicted from their original monastery on 18 October and all their property confiscated. They were taken to Compiègne and imprisoned there for eighteen months in the former Convent of the Visitation, during which time four of them died from the harsh conditions which included inadequate food and an outbreak of typhus. Among their fellow prisoners were the future Carmelite Martyrs of Compiègne. After petitioning to be allowed to go into exile in England, the seventeen survivors were released in April 1795 and put on a boat at Calais, which took them to Dover where they arrived destitute on 2 May. They were wearing the lay clothes left behind by the Compiègne martyrs, which hence became second-class relics. One of the nuns died in temporary lodgings in London.

Their convent in Cambrai was looted and turned into a prison. It was subsequently demolished.

=== Nuns at Woolton ===
The Benedictine monks in England (EBC) took the community under their care and sent them to the EBC mission in Woolton, near Liverpool, on 21 May 1795. There they were given a house, and a pre-existing girls' school to run. They were also told that they could not wear the religious habit - the EBC monks did not do so themselves at that time. While there were no English sumptuary law against the habit, popular anti-Catholic hostility could have led to the nuns wearing habits being charged with a breach of the peace.

Initially, the community occupied two houses, (45 and 47 Woolton Street), and later expanded into a third adjoining property. They had to depend on donations to survive, but the government granted the nuns a pension of one and a half guineas (£1.575) per month, which gave the community an annual income of £302.40 (or £36,617 in 2020 values). Their small school, for girls aged five to thirteen, was a success and had eighteen pupils by 1807, each charged a fee of 18 guineas per annum (£18.90, £2 289 in 2020 values). The nuns also taught a few primary age boys. One of these, John Bede Polding, would become a monk of Downside Abbey and the first Roman Catholic archbishop of Sydney in Australia.

In 1807, the nuns decided to move. They regarded themselves as temporary refugees waiting to go home to Cambrai, but attempts to reclaim their property from the French government proved futile. Meanwhile, four of the community had died but seven new postulants had joined.

=== Move to Warwickshire ===
An interim home was found in 1808 at Salford Hall, Abbot's Salford, Warwickshire which was a mansion built in 1602 by a recusant family, the Stanfords. It contained a priest hole, and a public Catholic chapel fitted out in the early 18th century and served by EBC monks from 1727 until the end of the century.

The nuns took their school with them, and were able to resume wearing the habit and created an enclosure (they divided the chapel with a grille). However, the house was only lent to them and was not for purchase. The nuns bought a purpose-built convent twenty-eight years later, in 1835.

Augustine Lawson, EBC chaplain at Salford Hall, until he died in 1830, helped the community to find a permanent home. His dying wish was to be buried with the sisters. When they moved in 1838 he was disinterred and re-buried at their new home. His body was found to be incorrupt. That same year of 1830, the last Cambrai nun died. Salford Hall is now a hotel and Grade I listed building.

=== Stanbrook construction ===
In 1835, with the encouragement of Bernard Short based at Little Malvern, later the abbey chaplain, the nuns bought Stanbrook Hall at Callow End in the parish of Powick (52.1473°N 2.2428°W) in the Severn Valley, near Malvern, Worcestershire. This was a country mansion, built in 1755 by Richard Casean, alderman of Worcester.

The nuns decided to keep it as the presbytery for their EBC chaplain and his domestic staff. For their own residence, they employed the architect and county surveyor, Charles Day, who was a brother of one of the nuns. He added two conjoined blocks to the west wing of the Hall, one with a chapel was for the community, the other for the school. The two-storey edifice in red brick, completed in 1838, had no traditional monastic features. The nuns' chapel is significant in the architectural history of the period owing to its neo-classical style and the role of Baroque design influences on its interior. The original entrance to the new abbey precinct was to the south, on Upton Road, where a pair of semi-octagonal gate lodges survive and are Grade-II listed. The sisters' graveyard was laid out between the Presbytery and Abbey with Lawson re-interred there.

=== Pugins' patrons ===
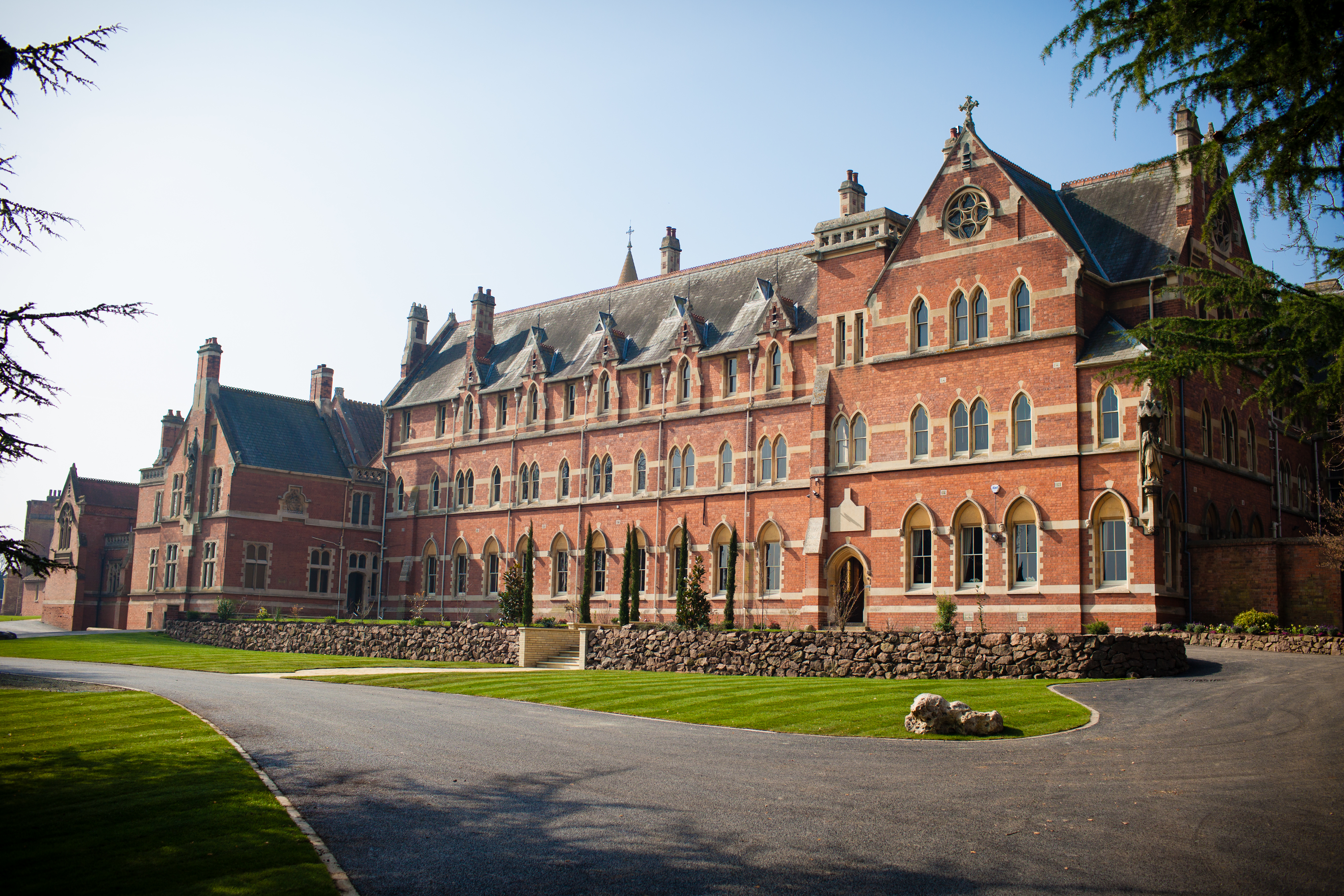
Former Stanbrook Abbey main building in Worcestershire. Entrance to right, sacristy to left, with presbytery in distance.

In 1863, Laurence Shepherd was appointed chaplain and served until his death in 1885. He helped the nuns become noted practitioners of Gregorian chant, through the influence of the liturgical tradition being revived by Prosper Guéranger at Solesmes Abbey in France. He also aided them in revising their monastic constitutions in line with Guéranger's ideas. The community was growing rapidly, as vocations to the religious life were plentiful at the time. He encouraged the community to build a complete new abbey, reflecting the high-status of a medieval monastery with buildings around a square cloister. The plans for the scheme were drawn up by Shepherd with the assistance of Hildebrand de Hemptinne, a Belgian Benedictine monk from Beuron Archabbey. The architectural work was entrusted to the family of the late Augustus Welby Pugin, which was based in Ramsgate. Work was to continue until the end of the century, but left unfinished.

==== Church 1869 ====
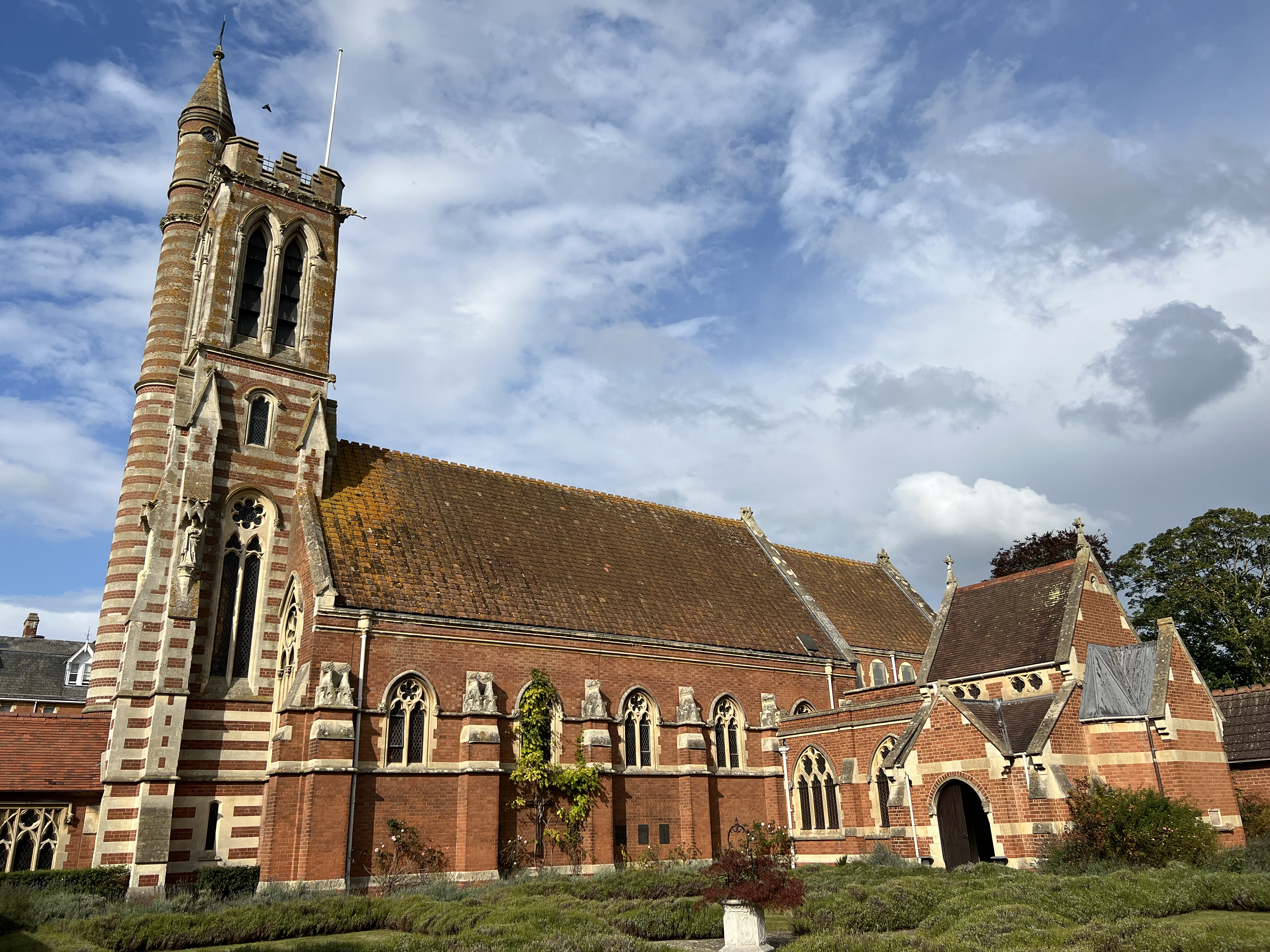
The abbey church

The abbey church was begun in 1869 during the term of office of Abbess Scholastica Gregson. The site was just to the north of the graveyard. When the designs of Edward Welby Pugin, in Gothic Revival style, proved too expensive, Shepherd insisted on changes including a traditional tall church tower with a clock and a ceiling vault for acoustic reasons. Work was completed in 1871. A set of human remains from a Roman catacomb, a virgin martyr given the name St Fulgentia, was enshrined under the high altar. Work on the three cloister ranges to the north of the church began in 1878, under the collaboration of Peter Paul Pugin, Cuthbert Welby Pugin and George Ashlin from Ireland. Abbess Gertrude d'Aurillac Dubois was in office, when the east range, containing the main abbey entrance and the parlours, was finished by 1880. The work was then paused.

==== Holy Thorn Chapel ====
The Holy Thorn Chapel of 1885-86 was added to the south side of the church by Peter Paul Pugin, in the style of a medieval pilgrimage shrine, and housed the Holy Thorn, which was a relic of the crown of thorns from Glastonbury Abbey (not to be confused with the Glastonbury Thorn, which was a tree). Laurence Shepherd was buried here in 1885 and Abbess Gertrude d'Aurillac Dubois in 1897. Peter Paul Pugin blocked up the tower entrance of the church with a monumental abbatial throne which dominated the choir and rivalled the high altar at the other end of the church.

==== North range ====
The north range was resumed in 1895, and completed in 1898. The last addition to the main abbey buildings was the sacristy, in 1899. Work on the grand project ceased in 1900. The west range was not begun.

== 20th century ==
The community believed they adhered to papal enclosure from 1880 when they moved into their new quarters. However, the rules of papal enclosure are not compatible with running a school. The new abbey project had envisaged the school expanding in a proposed separate wing. This would have split the community between those strictly enclosed and teaching externs. Hazel Hastings was one of the later pupils, as her mother had become a nun. She said there were about twelve pupils who wore black habits and veils and learnt liturgy, plainsong, Latin, calligraphy, heraldry, and astronomy. She left in about 1911. In 1918 the small school closed.

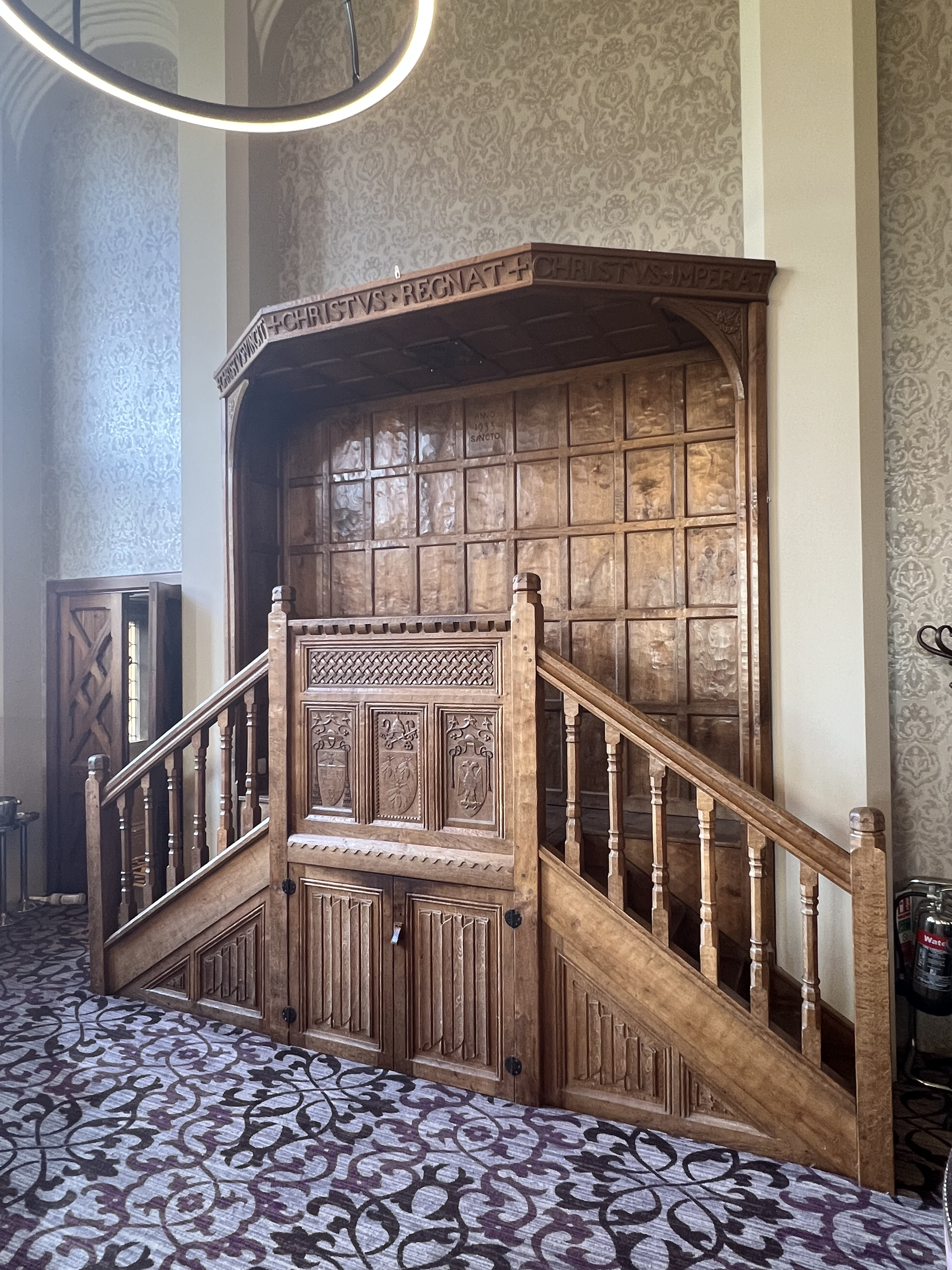
The refectory pulpit by Robert Thompson 1933

In 1923, the nuns commissioned the furniture maker Robert "Mouseman" Thompson to fit out their refectory including tables, chairs, wall panelling with his signature carved mouse. The tables and chairs were taken to Wass when the community later moved.

In 1935, when the abbey was at its height, the community numbered eighty-two. This total comprised fifty-two choir nuns, nineteen conversae, seven novices, and four extern sisters. The 'conversae' or claustral sisters were not bound to the Divine Office and did the domestic and manual work, but stayed in the enclosure. The externs were the ones who ventured outside as necessary. The community had two EBC monk-chaplains resident at the Presbytery.

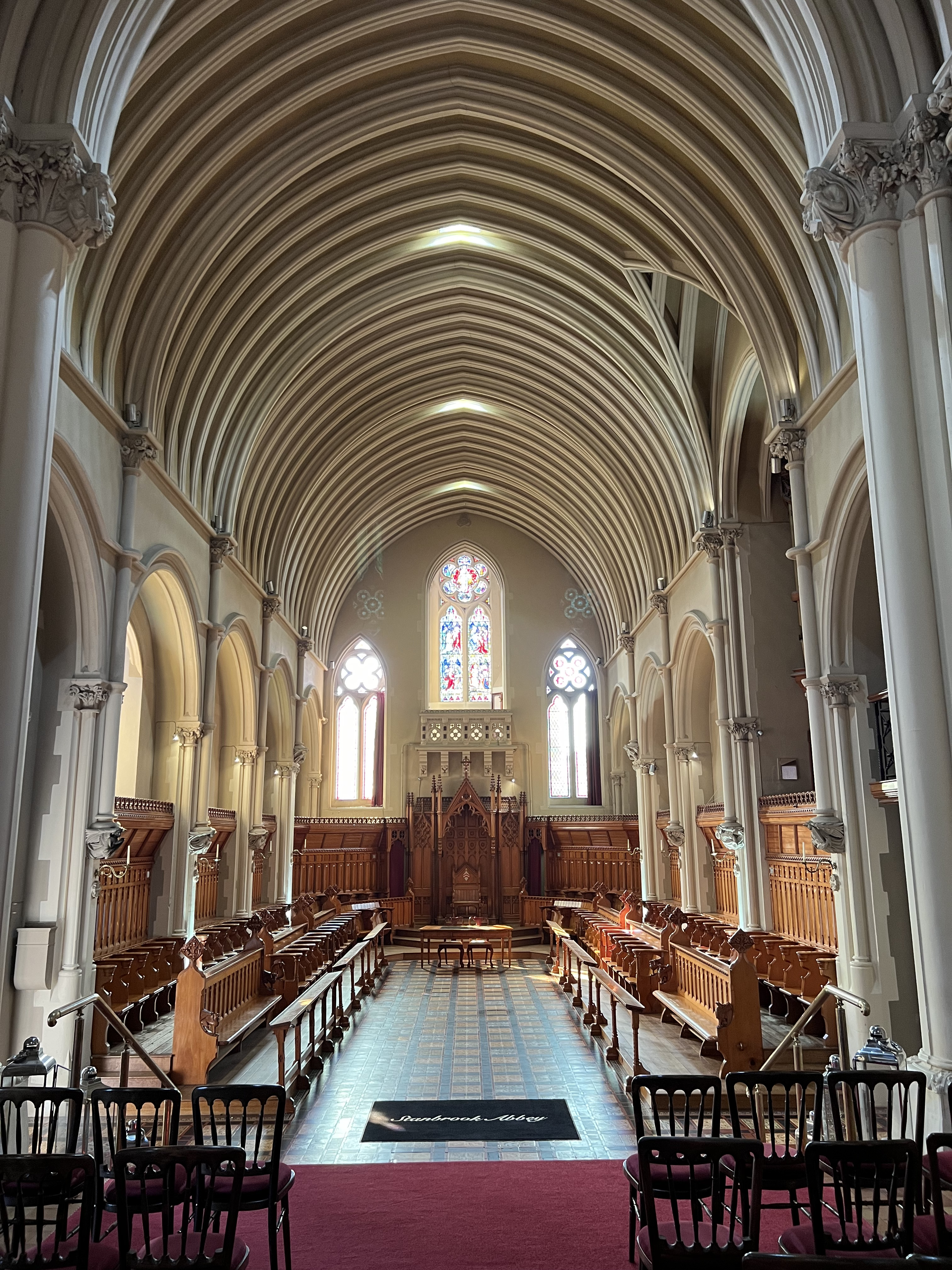
The remodelled church interior

The height of Edward Pugin's grand Gothic high altar obscured the great rose window at the church's east end which contained stained glass in honour of the Virgin Mary. As a result it was cut down in 1937 by Geoffrey Webb. The monstrance throne cavity was filled with a sculpture of Christ the King by Philip Lindsey Clark.

In 1950, the community was still flourishing and comprised around seventy, a number it kept for the next twenty years. This made it the biggest women's monastery in Britain. Around this time, the lush decorative wall stencilling in the church sanctuary, which included depictions of Christ and the saints, was partly painted over.

The failure to complete the new buildings left the abbey's facilities not fit for purpose. Ambulatories in red brick occupying the missing two sides of the cloisters were designed by Martin Fisher in 1965. Historic England dismissed this work as "not considered to be of interest". The community numbered seventy-one at that stage.

Further reconstruction occurred when the church sanctuary was re-ordered in 1971 by Anthony Thompson, with the loss of the original Pugin fittings including the cut-down high altar, the surviving wall paintings, and the Minton encaustic floor tiles for a plainer style. The wrought iron rood screen was donated to Birmingham Art Gallery, and the altar in the extern chapel (dedicated to the Sacred Heart) was also removed.

=== Stanbrook Abbey Press ===
Stanbrook Abbey has been celebrated for its Gregorian chant, the publication of devotional literature, and fine printing.

The Stanbrook Abbey Press was established in 1876 and was at one time one of the oldest examples of a private press in England. It acquired an international reputation for fine printing under Dames Hildelith Cumming and Felicitas Corrigan. Collections of the press are held at Boston College and the University of Maryland.

Although digital printing and publishing continues at the Abbey on a small scale, the fine letterpress printing which made the Press famous had ceased by 1990. That year marked the death, at 95, of Dame Werburg Welch, an artist whose work in a range of media can be found across the country; she was also an arboriculturist, taking care of the orchard at Stanbrook.

Examples of work from the Stanbrook Abbey Press include:

- St Teresa of Avila; tr. by Benedictines of Stanbrook Abbey (1921). The Interior Castle or The Mansions. London: Thomas Baker.
- Meinrad Craighead. The Mother's Birds: Images for a Death and a Birth. Worcester: Stanbrook Abbey Press, 1976.
- Teresa of Avila; tr. by Benedictines of Stanbrook Abbey (2007). The Way of Perfection; St Teresa of Avila. Cosimo, Inc. ISBN 978-1-60206-260-3.

== Public access ==
Among the many visitors associated with the Stanbrook community, was the poet and Catholic convert, Siegfried Sassoon, who had some of his works published by the Stanbrook Press. The community was notable in the last third of the 20th century for setting liturgical texts in English to music in the plainchant tradition. A growing public interest in the "monastic experience", led the nuns in this period to extend their guest facilities. To the original 1865 Hermitage guest house were added the stables next door, to accommodate guests.

== 21st-century relocation ==
The 1971 re-fitting coincided with a revision of Roman Catholic liturgical practice after the Second Vatican Council. In addition, vocations to the religious life began to decline in the UK as of 1966. The decrease in vocations meant that monastic institutions became less viable. By 2002 the community numbered twenty-eight professed nuns, with two Postulants. The community had lost 60% of its membership in 25 years, and those left were ageing.

In April 2002 Abbess Joanna Jamieson announced that the Abbey would move from its Victorian abbey, with its 79,000 sq ft (7,300 m^{2}) of monastic buildings, "to make the best use of its human and financial resources". This led to controversy about priorities as shown in a letter to The Times newspaper, on 23 January 2006:

The present Abbess’s determination to sell up Stanbrook Abbey and build an inadequate bijou hideaway on the Yorkshire moors, in a National Park of all places, despite the wishes of some in her community, comes at the fag-end of the 1960s cult of ultramodernity in religion. This contempt for history and tradition will pass with the generation that created it, though it has done immense harm to the English Catholic Church and looks likely to consign the Stanbrook community to extinction.

Three sisters, including Catherine Wybourne (also known as 'Digitalnun'), left the community, and in September 2004 founded Holy Trinity Monastery at East Hendred in Oxfordshire.

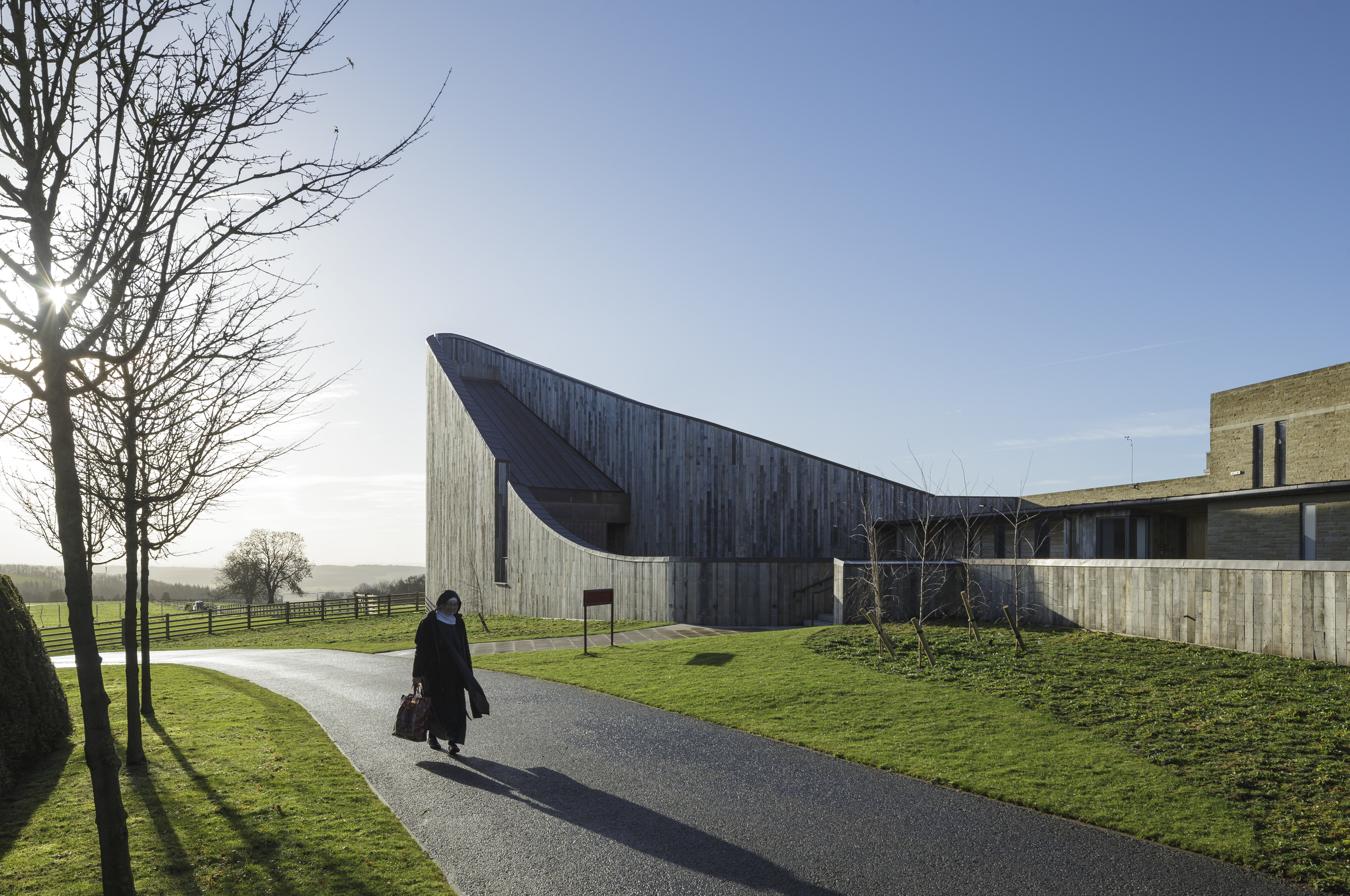
Stanbrook Abbey Church, Wass, Yorkshire

The Abbey bought Crief Farm at Wass in the North York Moors National Park. Construction of the new monastery began on 18 June 2007. The community moved into the new Stanbrook Abbey at Wass on 21 May 2009, after the first building phase had been completed. It involved shifting a 40,000 volume library of books and archives from Stanbrook, which was overseen by the theologian and former hermit, Mary Boulding, near the end of her life.

The architects at Wass were Feilden Clegg Bradley Studios. The relics of St Fulgentia were taken out of the altar when it was dismantled, and put into store until the new abbey church at Wass could be built. After May 2009, the original abbey church was formally deconsecrated in preparation for the sale of the property. Contrary to monastic tradition at the time of a move, the Stanbrook community took its former name to Wass.

== Stanbrook at Wass ==
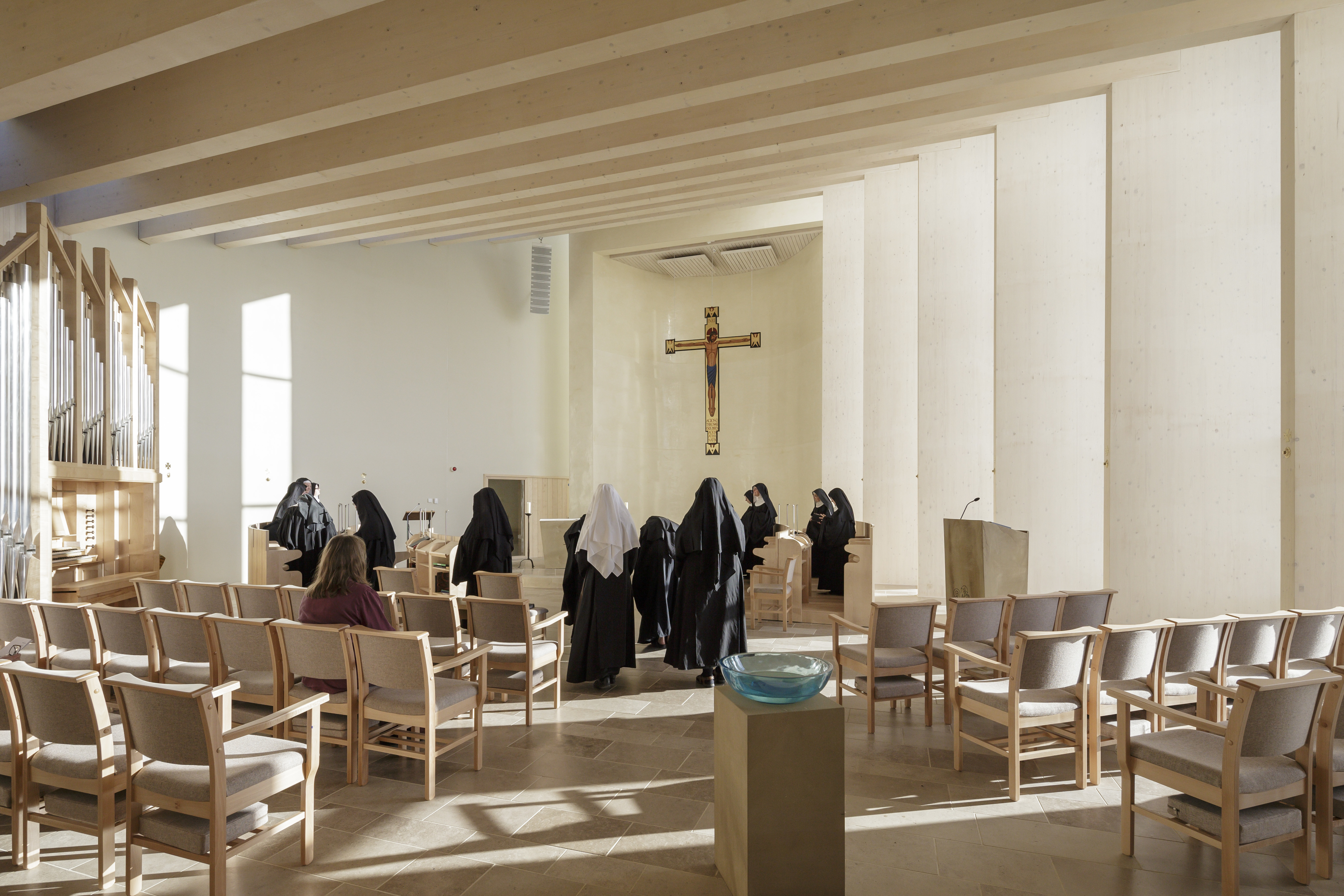
The interior of the church at Stanbrook Abbey, Wass

The old convent estate was put on the market for £6 million in 2009, but only sold in August 2010 for £4.5 million. Phase 2, the building of a new church, was completed in 2015. This cost £2.5 million.

The set of new abbey buildings was given a RIBA National Award in 2016. In 2020 the community numbered nineteen, including one oblate not in vows but sharing the life in all respects. The Abbey is the second largest Benedictine convent in England, after Ryde Abbey with twenty-eight. Two remaining able-bodied nuns went to live at Wass from the dissolved Colwich Abbey (1656), evolved as a daughter house from the Cambrai foundation.

== List of superiors ==
Previous superiors include (in alphabetical order of surname):

- Dame Gertrude d'Aurillac Dubois 1872-97 (Oversaw erection of conventual buildings at Stanbrook)
- Dame Mary Boulding 2008-2009
- Dame Clementia Cary
- Dame Barbara Constable
- Dame Catherine Gascoigne (First Abbess:1629-73)
- Dame Margaret Gascoigne
- Dame Frances Gawen 1623-9 (First superior, originally at Brussels. Prioress.)
- Dame Scholastica Gregson 1846-62 and 1868-72 (Oversaw erection of church.)
- Dame Cecilia A. Heywood
- Dame Joanna Jamieson
- Dame Laurentia McLachlan
- Dame Agnes More
- Dame Bridget More

== Daughter houses ==
=== Jamberoo Abbey ===
The first Roman Catholic archbishop of Sydney in Australia, John Bede Polding, had been taught by the nuns as a little boy. In 1849, he appealed to the abbey to provide nuns for a monastery that he was founding at Rydalmere, New South Wales, to be called Subiaco after the Italian location where St Benedict had begun monastic life. In response, Dame Magdalen le Clerc was sent to join Sister Scholastica Gregory from Princethorpe Priory (not of the English Benedictine Congregation, hence not a Dame), and the two founded what is now Jamberoo Abbey.

=== Abadia de Santa Maria, São Paulo ===
In 1907, a group of young women from São Paulo in Brazil entered the noviciate in order to become the founding community of the Abadia di Santa Maria in their city. This was founded in 1911, and itself became the mother-house of three other women's monasteries in Brazil as well as one in Argentina, Abadía de Santa Escolástica in Buenos Aires. From the latter are descended six monasteries: four in Argentina, one at Montevideo in Uruguay and one in Chile.

One of the Brazilian daughter houses, Abadia de Nossa Senhora das Graças in Belo Horizonte, has itself given rise to four further foundations in Brazil.

== Cultural connections ==
- Stanbrook Abbey was the model for Brede Abbey in Rumer Godden's 1969 novel, In This House of Brede. Godden, who had asked the nuns of Stanbrook for prayers when her elder daughter was facing a risky pregnancy, gifted the Abbey a share of the copyright on the novel.
- Iris Murdoch's novel The Bell is said to have been partly inspired by Stanbrook Abbey.
- Irish folk singer and Celtic harpist Mary O'Hara spent twelve years as a nun at Stanbrook Abbey.
- The pseudonym "Benedictine of Stanbrook" was used by Werburg Welch for a number of pieces of art.

== Abbey estate into hotel ==
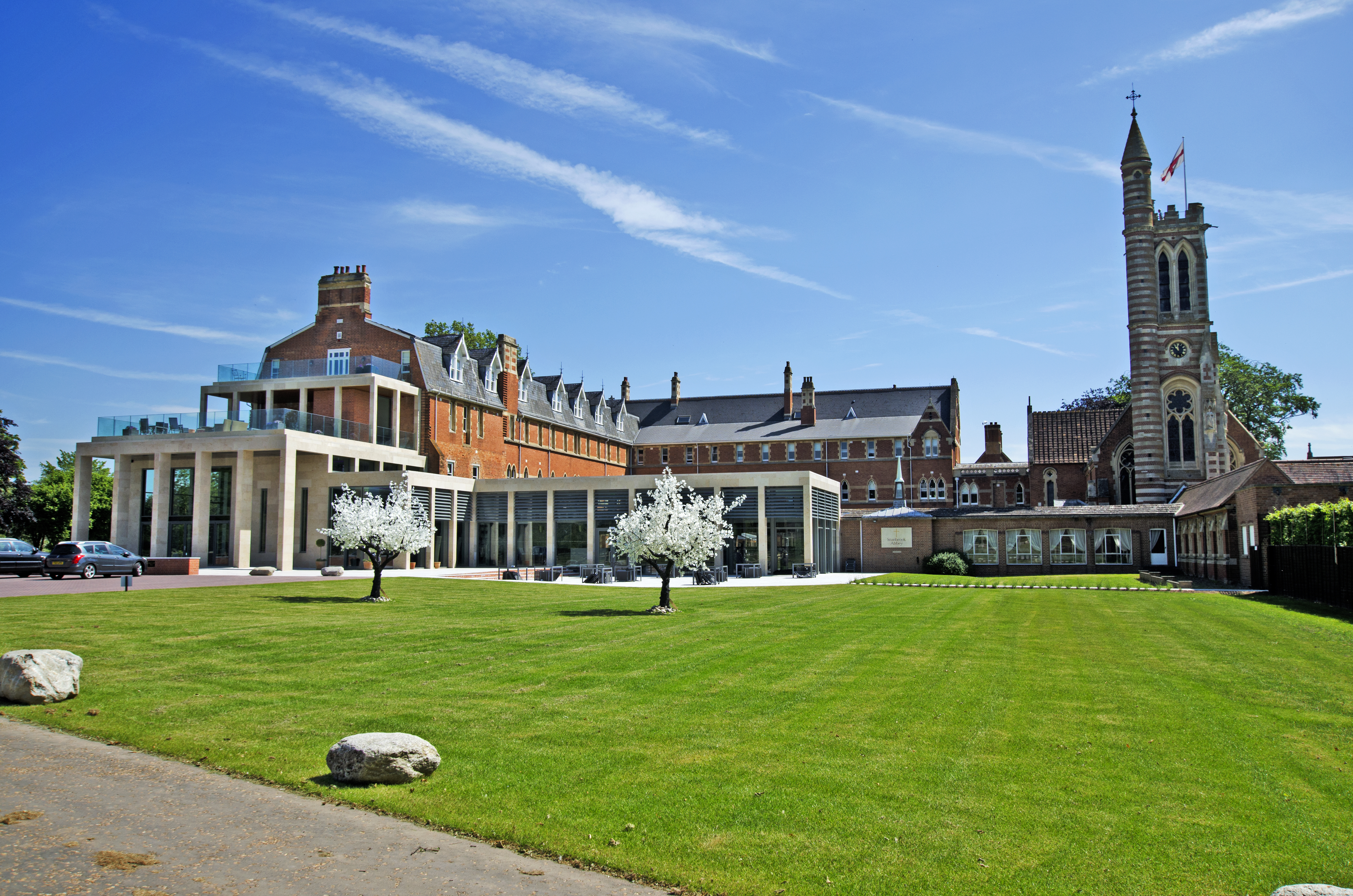
Hotel at former Stanbrook Abbey, Worcestershire

In August 2010, the Grade II-listed Worcestershire estate was sold to Clarenco LLP for conversion into an events venue and luxury hotel, called the "Stanbrook Abbey Hotel". The sisters had been unable to meet the necessary maintenance outlay, for half a century, and so the property was affected by leaky roofs and dry rot. As a result, the sale achieved only three-quarters of the original £6 million valuation.

The new owners erected an imposing entrance gateway west of the original one, laid out car parks and converted the nuns' cells, with no plumbing, into en-suite bedrooms. The grave markers on the sisters' graves were removed to allow the layout of a lavender garden on the graveyard, and were attached to a nearby wall. The abbey entrance in the east range was enhanced by a monumental new entrance portico with attached champagne bar. A roof terrace was added to the west end of the north range. A large marquee-style hall to serve as an events venue was attached to the Old House, and both of these additions were deliberately done in a contemporary style in contrast to the original buildings. The hotel was opened in 2015.

In 2017, the hotel was sold on to Hand Picked Hotels, which continued the conversion of cells to bedrooms in the north range and fitted out the former refectory as a fine-dining restaurant. in 2020 there were seventy bedrooms.

== See also ==
- Rule of Saint Benedict
- Anti-Catholicism in the United Kingdom
- List of monastic houses in North Yorkshire
- List of Benedictine monasteries in France
- List of abbeys and priories
- Crispian Hollis
