= Whitehead (surname) =

Whitehead is a surname. Recorded in a number of spellings including Whithead, Whitehed, Whithed, and Whitsed, this surname is of English origins. It usually derives from the Old English pre–7th century word "hwit" meaning white, plus "heafod", a head, combined to form a descriptive nickname for someone with white hair.

== Notable persons named Whitehead ==
=== Several people ===
- Several people named Alan Whitehead
- Several people named Charles Whitehead (including Charlie)
- Several people named David Whitehead
- Several people named George Whitehead
- Several people named Henry Whitehead
- Several people named James Whitehead (including Jim and Jimmy)
- Several people named John Whitehead
- Several people named Joseph Whitehead
- Several people named Peter Whitehead
- Several people named Richard Whitehead
- Several people named Robert Whitehead
- Several people named Rowland Whitehead
- Several people named Thomas Whitehead
- Several people named William Whitehead (including Willie)

=== A-C ===
- Adam Whitehead (born 1980), British swimmer
- Adrian Whitehead (born 1975), Australian rules footballer
- Agathe Whitehead (1891–1922), British heiress, first wife of Georg von Trapp of the Trapp Family Singers
- Alfred North Whitehead (1861–1947), British philosopher and mathematician
- Alfred Whitehead (composer) (1887–1974), English composer, organist, choirmaster and music educator, active in Canada
- Annie Whitehead (born 1955), English jazz trombone player
- Axle Whitehead (born 1980), Australian entertainer
- Barb Whitehead (born 1961), American golfer
- Ben Whitehead (born 1975), English voice actor
- Bob Whitehead (born 1953), American game designer and programmer
- Bob Whitehead (soccer), 20th century American soccer player
- Bruce Whitehead, American politician
- Bud Whitehead (born 1939), American football player
- Bus Whitehead (1928–2010), American basketball player
- Burgess Whitehead (1910–1993), American baseball player
- Chris Whitehead (born 1986), English rugby union player
- Christian Whitehead, Australian video game developer
- Chryssie Whitehead American actress, singer and dancer
- Cindy Whitehead (born 1962), American skateboarder
- Clay T. Whitehead (1938–2008), United States government official in charge of telecommunications
- Clive Whitehead (born 1955), English footballer - Bristol City and West Bromwich Albion
- Colson Whitehead (born 1969), American author

=== D-I ===
- Dariq Whitehead (born 2004), American professional basketball player
- Dean Whitehead (born 1982), English footballer
- Derek Whitehead (1944–2025), English rugby league footballer
- Don Whitehead (1908–1981), American journalist
- Donald R. Whitehead (1938–1990), American entomologist
- Donald S. Whitehead (1888–1957), American politician from Idaho
- Edward Whitehead (1908–1978), spokesman and later president of Schweppes
- E. T. Whitehead (1890–1956), British political activist
- Edgar Whitehead (1905–1971), Rhodesian politician
- Elliott Whitehead (born 1989), English rugby league player
- Emily Whitehead (born 2000), Australian artistic gymnast
- Ennis Whitehead (1895–1964), Lieutenant General U.S. Air Force
- Fionn Whitehead (born 1996/1997), English actor
- Frances Whitehead (1925–2019), British secretary and personal assistant to John Stott
- Frank Whitehead (American politician) (1892–1976), American politician from Florida
- Frank Whitehead (Canadian politician), Canadian politician
- Frederick Whitehead, (1853–1938), English landscape artist and illustrator
- Frederick Wilson Whitehead, (1863–1926), English organist, composer and music teacher
- Gary Whitehead (born 1965), American poet and painter
- Geoffrey Whitehead (born 1939), English actor
- Gill Whitehead British executive
- Gillian Whitehead (born 1941), New Zealand composer
- Graham Whitehead (1922–1981), British racing driver
- Gregory Whitehead, American writer, radiomaker and audio artist
- Gustave Whitehead (1874–1927), aviation pioneer who claimed to have made the first powered airplane flight
- Hal Whitehead, Canadian biologist
- Hope Whitehead (born 1959), American politician
- Hugh Whitehead (died 1551), prior of the Benedictine monastery at Durham, England
- Ian Whitehead (born 1946), Scottish footballer and manager

=== J-N ===
- J. Gordon Whitehead (1895–1954), a man who punched Houdini before the magician could brace himself, which is speculated to have caused Houdini's death
- J. H. C. Whitehead (1904–1960), British mathematician
- Jamal Whitehead, American lawyer
- Jason John Whitehead, Canadian stand-up comedian, active in Britain
- Jay Whitehead (born 1959), American author and publisher
- Jef "Wrest" Whitehead (born 1989), American Metal Musician & Tattoo artist
- Jennifer Whitehead (born 1977), American volleyball player and coach
- Jermaine Whitehead (born 1993), American football player
- Jerome Whitehead (1956–2012), American basketball player
- Jonathan Whitehead (1960–2020), English composer
- Jordan Whitehead (born 1997), American football player
- Lees Whitehead (1864–1913), English cricketer
- Lucky Whitehead (born 1992), American football player
- Luke Whitehead (born 1981), American basketball player
- Luther Whitehead (1869–1931), English cricketer
- Martha Whitehead, Texas State Treasurer
- Maurice Whitehead (born 1952), British historian and archivist
- Max Whitehead (1923–2010), Australian rugby league footballer
- Maxey Whitehead (born 1985), American voice actress
- Mike Whitehead (born 1981), American mixed martial arts fighter
- Milt Whitehead (1862–1901), Canadian baseball player
- Naomi Whitehead (born 1910), American supercentenarian who is the oldest living American person.
- Neville Whitehead (bassist), New Zealand jazz bassist and luthier
- Nick Whitehead (1933–2002), Welsh sprinter
- Nikki Whitehead (1975–2010), American mother murdered by her twin daughters Jasmiyah and Tasmiyah
- Nicole Whitehead (born 1980), American model and Playboy Playmate
- Norman Whitehead (1915–1983, English landscape painter

=== O-W ===
- O.Z. Whitehead (1911–1998), American actor and author
- Paul Whitehead, British painter and graphic artist
- Paxton Whitehead (1937–2023), British actor
- Phil Whitehead (born 1969), English footballer
- Phillip Whitehead (1937–2005), British politician, television producer and writer
- R. Whitehead (cricketer), English cricketer between 1785 and 1800
- Ralph Radcliffe Whitehead (1854–1929), founder of the Byrdcliffe Arts and Crafts Colony, New York
- Rex Whitehead (1948–2014), Australian cricket umpire
- Ron Whitehead, American poet
- Ruth Holmes Whitehead (1947–2023), Canadian ethnologist
- Stanley Whitehead (1911–1976), New Zealand politician
- Stanley Whitehead (physicist) (1902–1956), British physicist
- Steve Whitehead (born 1960), English photorealist painter
- Stuart Whitehead (born 1976), English footballer
- Tahir Whitehead (born 1990), American football player
- Terrell Whitehead (born 1988), American football player
- Terrence Whitehead (born 1983), American football player
- Þór Whitehead (Thor Whitehead) (born 1943), Icelandic historian
- Thora Whitehead (1936–2021), Australian shell collector and malacologist
- Tim Whitehead (ice hockey) (born 1961), American ice hockey coach
- Tim Whitehead (rugby player) (born 1988), South African rugby union player
- Walter Whitehead (1840–1913), English surgeon

== See also ==
- Whitehead baronets
- Whitehead (disambiguation)
- Weißhaupt, German counterpart
- Weißkopf, German counterpart
