= James Whitehead =

James or Jim Whitehead may refer to:

- Sir James Whitehead, 1st Baronet (1834–1917), British merchant and Liberal Party politician
- Sir James Beethom Whitehead (1858–1928), British diplomat
- James Whitehead (physician) (1812–1885), English physician
- James Whitehead (cricketer, born 1860) (1860–1904), English cricketer, played for Warwickshire 1894–1900 and for Liverpool & District in 1891–92
- Jimmy Whitehead (1870–1929), English footballer
- James Whitehead (police officer) (1880–1955), British Indian Army officer and senior officer in the London Metropolitan Police
- James Whitehead (cricketer, born 1890) (1890–1919), English cricketer, played for the MCC in 1912
- James Whitehead (South African cricketer) (1882–1940), South African cricketer, played for Warwickshire, Western Province and Griqualand West
- James Whitehead (poet) (1936–2003), American poet
- Jim Whitehead (politician) (born 1942), American Republican member of the Georgia State Senate
- Jim Whitehead (computer scientist), American computer scientist
