= 2014 Saint-Henri train sideswipe incident =

2014 train collision in Montreal, Quebec

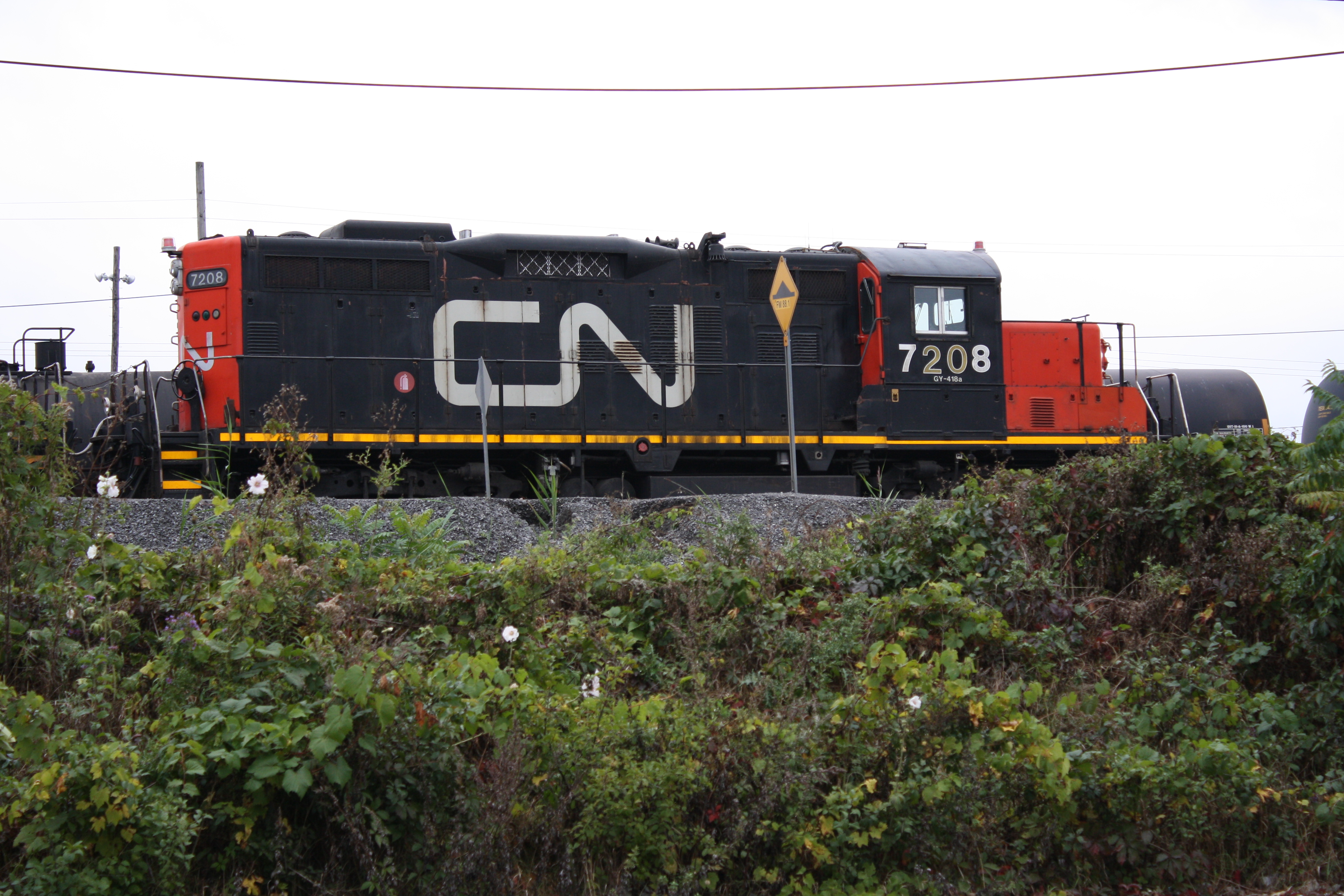
- CN GP9RM #7208, one of the locomotives involved in the sideswipe incident, on October 3, 2009.

Details
- Date: February 23, 2014; 12 years ago 12:05 am
- Location: Saint-Henri, Montreal, Quebec, Canada
- Country: Canada
- Line: CN's Montreal subdivision
- Operator: Canadian National Railway (CN)
- Incident type: Sideswipe train collision
- Cause: Human error from a distraction and a missed signal

Statistics
- Trains: Two, CN 7208 and CN Q12111-21/CN 121
- Crew: Four, two on both trains
- Deaths: 0
- Injured: 0

The 2014 Saint-Henri train sideswipe incident was a train collision that occurred at Saint-Henri in Montreal, Quebec, Canada at 12:05 am on February 23, 2014, on the Canadian National (CN)'s Montreal subdivision.

== Background ==
=== Yard assignment train and train Q12111-21 ===
At 9:00 pm on February 22, 2014, a Canadian National (CN) yard assignment train was switching with a two-man train crew from CN's Taschereau Yard to the Port of Montreal in Montreal, Quebec. The train was composed of:

- CN GP9RM #7208
- CN GP9RM #7224
- 25 fully-loaded grain cars
  - Soo Line grain car #122215
  - Soo Line grain car #121820

The yard assignment train departed Taschereau Yard at 11:15 pm. CN train Q12111-21, also known as CN intermodal train 121, was travelling to Toronto from Halifax, Nova Scotia. The train was pulling a total of 120 intermodal cars.

=== Sideswipe incident ===
The crew of CN yard assignment train had finished performing a running brake test at 11 mph (18 km/h) to check if the braking system was working, after the tests were done, with the train stopping in 32 seconds, they proceeded on the journey to the Port of Montreal. At 12:03 am on February 23, 2014, the yard assignment was travelling at 11 mph (18 km/h) when it rolls past a red signal at Milepost 3.60, near switch 501.

CN intermodal train 121 sideswipes the yard assignment train at 12:05 am, bending CN #7208's right side of the frame and damaging the track itself on the line, the two Soo Line hopper cars of the 25 hopper cars had derailed along with CN #7224, while the 120-car train of CN intermodal train 121 didn't derail, but intermodal cars 13, 14, 15, 16, and 17 were damaged after scraping the frame of GP9RM #7208. However, not a single person was killed or injured in the wreck. One of the two GP9RM's fuel tanks began to leak 3,500 litres (3,500,000 millilitres) of diesel fuel as a result of the sideswipe, but didn't start a fire.

== Investigation ==
The Transportation Safety Board of Canada (TSB) launched an investigation and they found multiple causes, they found out that the crew of the CN yard assignment train, passed a red signal, resulting in the collision with CN intermodal train 121. The conductor, at the time, was distracted while copying instructions from the rail traffic controller (RTC). The assistant conductor had left the lead locomotive, leaving the conductor alone in the cab.

"The first train tried to brake, but it didn't stop in time and collided with the second train at a point where their tracks converged"

— Guy Laporte,

Borough Mayor Benoît Dorais was upset that Canadian National (CN) had informed elected officials very late and with little detail to back it up, which led to him criticizing CN for poor communication, he stated in an interview:

"I only received an email from CN around 10:00 a.m., 10 hours after the accident"
"It contained very little information, less than what we were reading in the media, which, moreover, contradicted each other."

— Benoit Dorais,

== Aftermath ==
The TSB released its final report on August 6, 2015, identifying the cause of the accident, as the CN yard assignment crew, operating with a remote-control locomotive (Beltpack), failed to recognize and comply with a stop signal, leading to a collision.

While cleanup of the wreckage was going, the two Soo Line hopper cars and CN GP9RM #7224 were re-railed, a crane was used to re-rail CN #7208, and due to the sideswipe damaging the frame of #7208, the frame of #7208 collapsed, causing CN to consider the locomotive damaged beyond repair and resulting in the #7208 being scrapped on site.

GP9RM #7224 was repaired by CN and continued service until being sold to Lambton Diesel Specialists, Inc. (LDSX) and is still in service as LDSX #7224 as of 2026 on the Trillium Railway (TRRY).

After the accident, the Green Party of Canada urges the federal government to strengthen rules for trains operating in urban centers including the CN's Montreal subdivision.

"This is not the place to permit automatic trains"

— Daniel Green, The Gazette,

The Green Party of Canada argued that urban residents were at greater risk because the trains would often pass close to their homes, schools, and businesses. As a result, they called for stricter regulations, better oversight, and stronger safety standards for trains in cities.

== See also ==
- 1994 Grande Cache runaway train
- 1995 Kootenay Lake train derailment
- Lac-Mégantic rail disaster
- List of rail accidents (2010–19)
- List of rail accidents in Canada
