= Peter Whitehead =

Peter Whitehead may refer to:

- Peter Whitehead (businessman), (1793–1866) British businessman
- Peter Whitehead (racing driver) (1914–1958), British racing driver
- Peter Whitehead (filmmaker) (1937–2019), British filmmaker
- Peter Whitehead (runner) (born 1964), British long-distance runner
- Peter Whitehead (songwriter), songwriter for American disco group Village People
- Peter Whitehead (1959-1995), a Canadian Pacific Railway engineer who died in the 1995 Kootenay Lake train derailment

== See also ==
- Whitehead (surname)
