= Elizabeth Whitehead =

Elizabeth Whitehead may refer to:

- Elizabeth Whitehead (artist) (1854–1934) English painter
- Elizabeth Augustus Whitehead (1928–1983) American archaeologist and philanthropist
