= Paddockhurst =

Historic estate and former country house in West Sussex, England

- Type: Historic estate and former country house
- Location: Paddockhurst Road, near Turners Hill, West Sussex, England

Paddockhurst is a historic landed estate near Turners Hill in West Sussex, England. Its former principal house, Paddockhurst House, was sold in 1933 and now forms part of Worth Abbey and Worth School. A country house existed on the site by 1850, and the house was rebuilt in 1869–1872 for the London builder George Smith as one of the last works of Anthony Salvin. It was later enlarged during the ownership of the torpedo inventor Robert Whitehead and the industrialist Weetman Pearson, 1st Viscount Cowdray.

In 1933, the house and about 500 acres were sold to Downside Abbey for a new monastic foundation, later Worth Abbey. The wider Paddockhurst Estate continued separately as a landholding of farms, woodland, quarry and estate cottages in the Sussex Weald. The later history of the monastery and school is covered in the articles on Worth Abbey and Worth School.

The name Paddockhurst also appears in geology through the Paddockhurst Bone Bed, a fossil-bearing horizon recorded at Paddockhurst Park near Turners Hill.

== Location ==
The former Paddockhurst House is now incorporated into the Worth Abbey and Worth School site on Paddockhurst Road, about 1.5 miles west of Turners Hill, at TQ3180034215. The modern Worth Abbey site, which includes the former country house and adjoining land, is described in the Turners Hill Neighbourhood Plan as about 200 hectares in extent, mostly farmland or woodland. The wider Paddockhurst Estate has historically extended beyond the abbey and school site into the surrounding landscape.

== Estate history ==
=== Early history ===
Parish planning material records the Paddockhurst Estate in a manorial roll of 1727. By the mid-19th century, Paddockhurst had become a country house estate. Berry records a country house called Paddockhurst on the site by 1850, owned by Mr Livesay; by 1857, Captain Cazalet owned the house.

=== George Smith ===
George Smith, a London builder based in Pimlico who had worked on major projects including Alnwick Castle, owned Paddockhurst by 1865. He rebuilt the main house in 1869–1872 and expanded the surrounding estate to about 3,000 acres. Smith used the estate for hunting and livestock breeding, including Southdown sheep and cattle.

Smith died in 1873. The Paddockhurst Estate was put on the market in 1880, and the furniture, art collections and library were sold separately. A notice in The London Gazette of 18 May 1880 advertised the Paddockhurst Estate for sale in nine lots at the Mart, Tokenhouse Yard, London, on 24 June 1880, pursuant to a Chancery Division judgment. It described the estate as comprising a mansion, pleasure grounds and gardens, farms, cottages and extensive woodland, totalling nearly 3,000 acres in the parishes of Worth, West Hoathly, Ardingly and Balcombe. A Historic England Archive volume of sale particulars dated 7 June 1892 records the Paddockhurst Estate and its associated farms, lodges, stables and other holdings.

=== Robert Whitehead ===
Robert Whitehead, the engineer and torpedo developer, bought the estate in the early 1880s; DiCamillo gives Whitehead's period of ownership as 1881–1894. Whitehead had made his fortune through the development and manufacture of the first self-propelled torpedo.

Whitehead invested in both the house and the estate buildings. His works included a new wing on the house and farm buildings, including the water tower later known as the Clock Tower.

Whitehead also farmed the estate on a large scale, and his farming came under the scrutiny of the Irish agricultural reformer Horace Plunkett, who periodically visited Paddockhurst to help prepare and review the estate's farm accounts. Working on the accounts for 1889 in April 1890, Plunkett recorded in his diary that "the attempt to do light farming on poor land was to end in disaster", with a loss of about £3,000 plus rent; he also considered the estate's system of rearing and fattening calves a serious financial loss, and in July 1890 rode over the whole property to approve reforms in its tillage. When the year's accounts were made up in December 1890, the annual loss on the farms had been reduced to about £1,000. Staying at Paddockhurst in December 1890, Plunkett thought the house "all very new but very good", with a grand hall used for music and dancing, and noted its electric lighting.

=== Weetman Pearson and the Cowdrays ===
In 1894 the industrialist Weetman Dickinson Pearson bought the Paddockhurst Estate. The baronetcy created for him on 26 June 1894 used the designation "Pearson of Paddockhurst". Pearson was later raised to the peerage as Baron Cowdray in 1910 and created Viscount Cowdray in 1917.

Pearson commissioned further work from Aston Webb at Paddockhurst House and across the wider estate. Webb's work included a new south-east wing to the house, a winter garden and conservatory, West Lodge, Archway Lodge and extensions to the Home Farm. The dining-room frieze by Walter Crane, with Lady Pearson on a bicycle at the end of a transport cavalcade, also belonged to this Pearson phase.

In June 1898, members of the Architectural Association visited Paddockhurst during a summer excursion. The Builder reported that about forty members travelled to Three Bridges and were taken by carriage to the estate, where Aston Webb showed them over the house, farm, gardens and stables. The report said that the work had mainly been carried out in workshops on the estate, "without contract", and that the stone used was quarried on the estate. It also noted the newly arranged gardens and terraces, winter gardens, bowling alley, additional bedrooms, the dining room with its Walter Crane frieze, and a "2,000-light electric installation" that also heated the shaving water.

Paddockhurst also served as a political and social venue during Pearson's ownership. In July 1899, the Evening Star reported that a garden party at the estate brought Liberal peers, members of Parliament, parliamentary candidates and former members to Paddockhurst, with special trains running from Victoria to Three Bridges before visitors continued to the estate by road.

In 1914 Grand Duke Michael Alexandrovich of Russia leased Paddockhurst from Lord Cowdray after previously renting Knebworth House. He moved furniture and furnishings to the estate, but returned to Russia at the outbreak of the First World War before taking up residence. Sir Arthur Davidson later recorded that Michael left the house, park, servants, horses and personal effects in the care of Nicholas Johnson's mother, and Kruchinina states that Michael offered the house and park for British military use.

The Cowdray period shaped the village landscape around Turners Hill. The Turners Hill Village Design Statement says that Lord Cowdray purchased much of Turners Hill, and that at one time the estate owned land and property over about 19 square miles of the village. It records New Stone Cottages in East Street, built in 1919 by Lord Cowdray and designed by Aston Webb, as five pairs of Tudor-style cottages with stone lower storeys, timbered upper parts and 42-foot chimneys.

=== Sale of the house ===
In 1933, after the Cowdray family had faced death duties, the house and about 500 acres were sold to Downside Abbey. Monks from Downside established a religious community and school on the site, which became Worth Priory as a dependency of Downside. The sale separated the house from much of the wider Paddockhurst Estate. DiCamillo states that the Cowdray family retained about 4,500 acres around the house.

== Paddockhurst House ==
The house is now Grade II listed as Worth Abbey. It largely dates from George Smith's 1869–1872 Tudor-style rebuild to the designs of Anthony Salvin.

Historic England describes the main north wing as one of Salvin's last works, with ashlar walls, stone-mullioned casement windows, a non-central tower, and a projecting porch with octagonal buttresses and griffin figures. Historic England also records major later additions, including the Whitehead wing of 1883 and Pearson-era additions around 1921.

=== Whitehead and Cawston additions ===
In 1883, Robert Whitehead added a single-storey wing designed by Arthur Cawston to the south-west corner of Paddockhurst House, extending the garden front. The wing bears Whitehead's initials, "R.W.". Berry describes the wing as containing a large music room in a late-medieval style and says that Cawston also designed a semi-octagonal porte-cochère with Gothic tracery, later replaced.

=== Webb additions ===
Aston Webb worked on Paddockhurst House in 1895–1898 and again in 1919–1923. His first phase included a new wing on the south-east of the house, containing the dining room decorated by Walter Crane, along with a winter garden and conservatory, much of which has since been demolished. Between 1919 and 1923, Webb linked the west, or entrance, front of the house to Salvin's former stable block and replaced Cawston's entrance with the current one. Historic England notes rainwater heads dated 1921 and probable 1921 additions to the two northernmost window bays.

=== Dining room and Walter Crane frieze ===
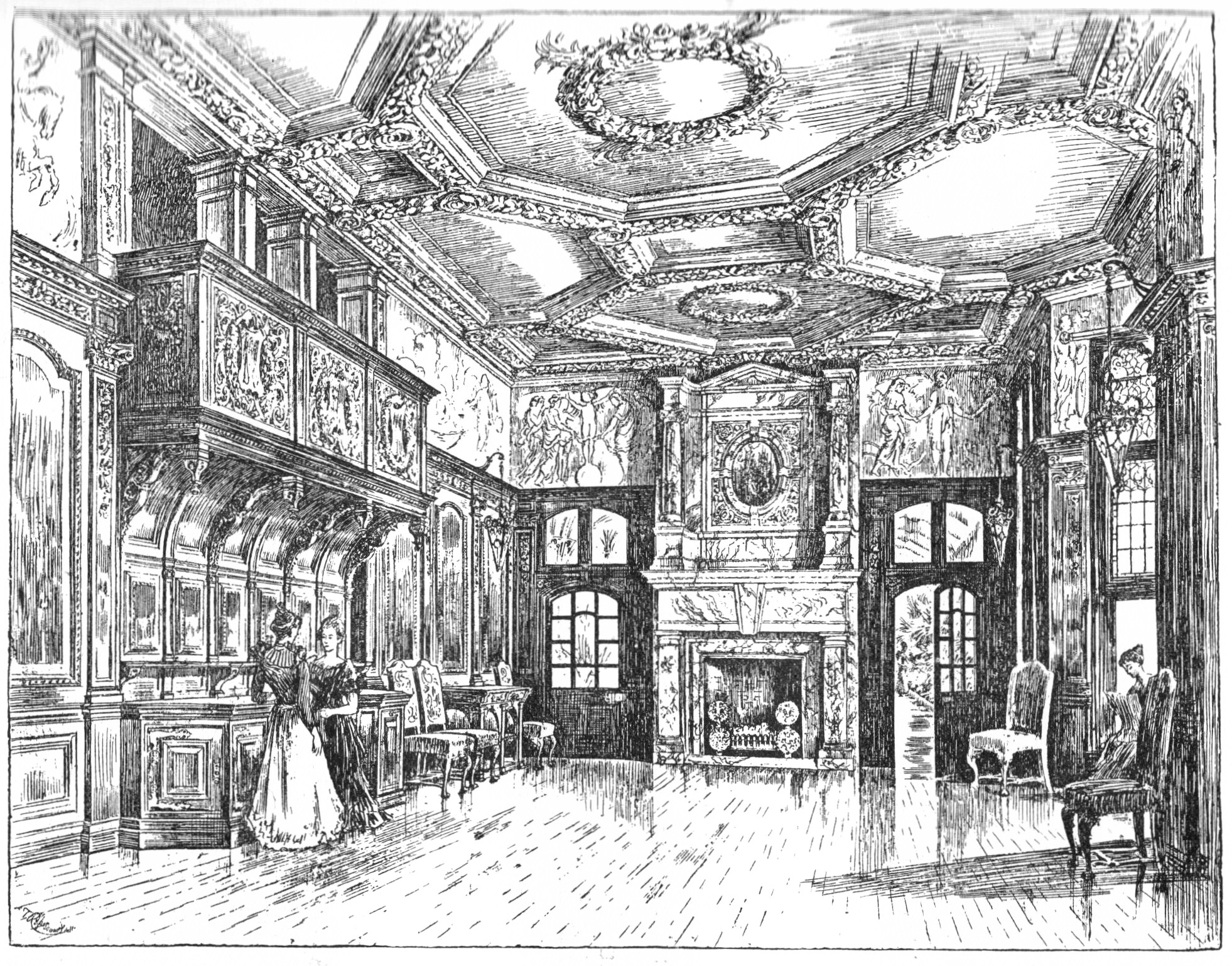
The Dining Room at Paddockhurst, illustrated in T. Raffles Davison's Modern Homes (1909).

The dining room, later known as the Great Room, is one of the house's most notable interiors. It was part of the decorative scheme created for Pearson's house. DiCamillo describes it as measuring about 45 by 20 feet, with pavonazzo and alabaster fireplaces and a frieze by Walter Crane representing the history of locomotion.

Crane wrote in his autobiography that Aston Webb asked him to design the frieze and that it was "for the dining-room, and to be in plaster". P. G. Konody's The Art of Walter Crane illustrates or lists Paddockhurst frieze subjects including The Canal Boat, Coaching, Primitive Locomotion and Cycling.

Berry describes the frieze as a history of transport, with Lady Pearson on a bicycle at the end of the cavalcade. The bicycle was said to refer to a family story in which Sir Weetman Pearson bought Lady Pearson a silver-plated bicycle from Tiffany in New York in 1894. Berry also places the frieze within Pearson's wider decorative scheme for the house, including mahogany sideboards and panelling by Waring & Gillow.

=== Associated listed structures ===
Several associated buildings and structures are listed. The former stables at Worth Abbey are Grade II listed and dated 1885. Berry says that Salvin designed a stable block at Paddockhurst, which was extensively altered but retained a datestone of 1865. The listed former stables form an L-shaped block in red brick with stone quoins, half-timbering, plaster infilling and a tower with clock faces.

A separate Grade II listed screen and two gateways west of Worth Abbey are dated 1922. They terminate the vista at the west end of the carriage drive, with octagonal stone piers, obelisks, wrought-iron double gates and an elaborate overthrow with coronets.

A 17th-century cottage on Church Road is listed as a "Cottage belonging to the Paddockhurst Estate". Newhouse Farm on Paddockhurst Lane in Ardingly is Grade II listed. Historic England describes it as a model dairy farm built around 1900 for the Paddockhurst Estate and says that Aston Webb may have designed it, probably as the home farm of the estate.

=== Later use as Worth Priory and Worth Abbey ===
After the 1933 sale, the former Paddockhurst House became Worth Priory and later Worth Abbey. The later history of the monastery and school is covered in the articles on Worth Abbey and Worth School.

== Wider Paddockhurst Estate ==
After the 1933 sale, Paddockhurst continued as a landed estate separated from its former principal house. Country Life described Parham Park and the "extensive landholding of Paddockhurst, without its mansion (now called Worth Abbey)" as remaining in the same family ownership through trusts, while DiCamillo states that the Cowdray family retained about 4,500 acres around the house after selling Paddockhurst House and 500 acres to Downside Abbey.

The Turners Hill Village Design Statement describes Paddockhurst Estate as a major commercial undertaking within the parish, with land extending into the adjoining parishes of Worth and Balcombe. It says that the estate continues to operate forestry, timber-products and agricultural businesses, and that an old quarry owned by the estate supplied stone for many village properties. The estate's building-stone quarry, Paddockhurst Stone Pit at Newhouse Farm, is recorded in West Sussex County Council's minerals monitoring as an inactive sandstone quarry, safeguarded under the county minerals plan.

The retained estate developed as a substantial forestry enterprise. In May 1963 the Royal Forestry Society of England, Wales and Northern Ireland visited the Paddockhurst Estate, then extending to 2,600 acres and managed by A. K. Hughes, during its summer meeting at Tunbridge Wells. The account of the visit in the Journal of the Forestry Commission noted forty-year-old conifer stands, good young mixed plantations of conifers, oak and chestnut, and further ground being cleared for chestnut planting; a chestnut fence was used to exclude the public and reduce the risk of fire. In the Sussex Historic Landscape Characterisation, Paddockhurst Park is given as a West Sussex example of a "mixed plantation".

The Village Design Statement also describes Turners Hill as an estate village and says that many houses in and around the village are identifiable as Paddockhurst Estate property by their copper-beech red paintwork. Country Life gives the estate colour as "burgundy" at Paddockhurst, distinguishing it from the lighter "Parham Red" used at Parham Park. The statement adds that the estate's fields, hedgerows and woods help characterise the appearance of the village and its surroundings. The private Paddockhurst Fire Brigade served the village until 1939.

A landownership statement and map deposited with West Sussex County Council in 2017 by the Trustees of Paddockhurst Estate recorded the estate's holdings around Turners Hill as including parts of Worth Forest and Cowdray Forest, Oldhouse Warren, and land at Forest Barn Farm and Whitely Hill.

=== Estate water supply ===
A study by a Worth School industrial-archaeology group, published in Sussex Industrial History in 1983, traced the history of the estate's private water supply. The 1894 deed of sale from Whitehead to Pearson described spring water pumped by a hydraulic ram from Three Point Wood to a reservoir at South Hill and distributed by gravity. Pearson developed a new supply at Fire Wood in 1901, and in 1923 the consulting engineers Sir Alexander Binnie, Son & Deacon installed a water turbine, fed from the estate's hammerpond, to work the pumps. The house went onto the public mains in 1948, after which the private supply was adapted to serve agricultural needs until a mains supply reached the farms in 1954.

== Paddockhurst Bone Bed ==
The Paddockhurst Bone Bed is a fossil-bearing horizon in the Grinstead Clay Member at Paddockhurst Park near Turners Hill. In 1963 William A. Clemens reported that several Wealden mammalian fossils came from the Paddockhurst Bone Bed, part of the Grinstead Clay, and that the fossils added information about the multituberculate Loxaulax valdensis and showed the presence of a symmetrodont and eupantothere in early Cretaceous England. The bone bed and its fossil assemblage are also noticed in the Geological Conservation Review volume on Mesozoic and Tertiary fossil mammals and birds of Great Britain.
