= Frank Whitehead =

Frank Whitehead may refer to:

- Frank Whitehead (Canadian politician)
- Frank Whitehead (American politician)
