= Main Street Bridge (Jacksonville) =

Bridge in Jacksonville, United States of America

Main Street Bridge (John T. Alsop Jr. Bridge)
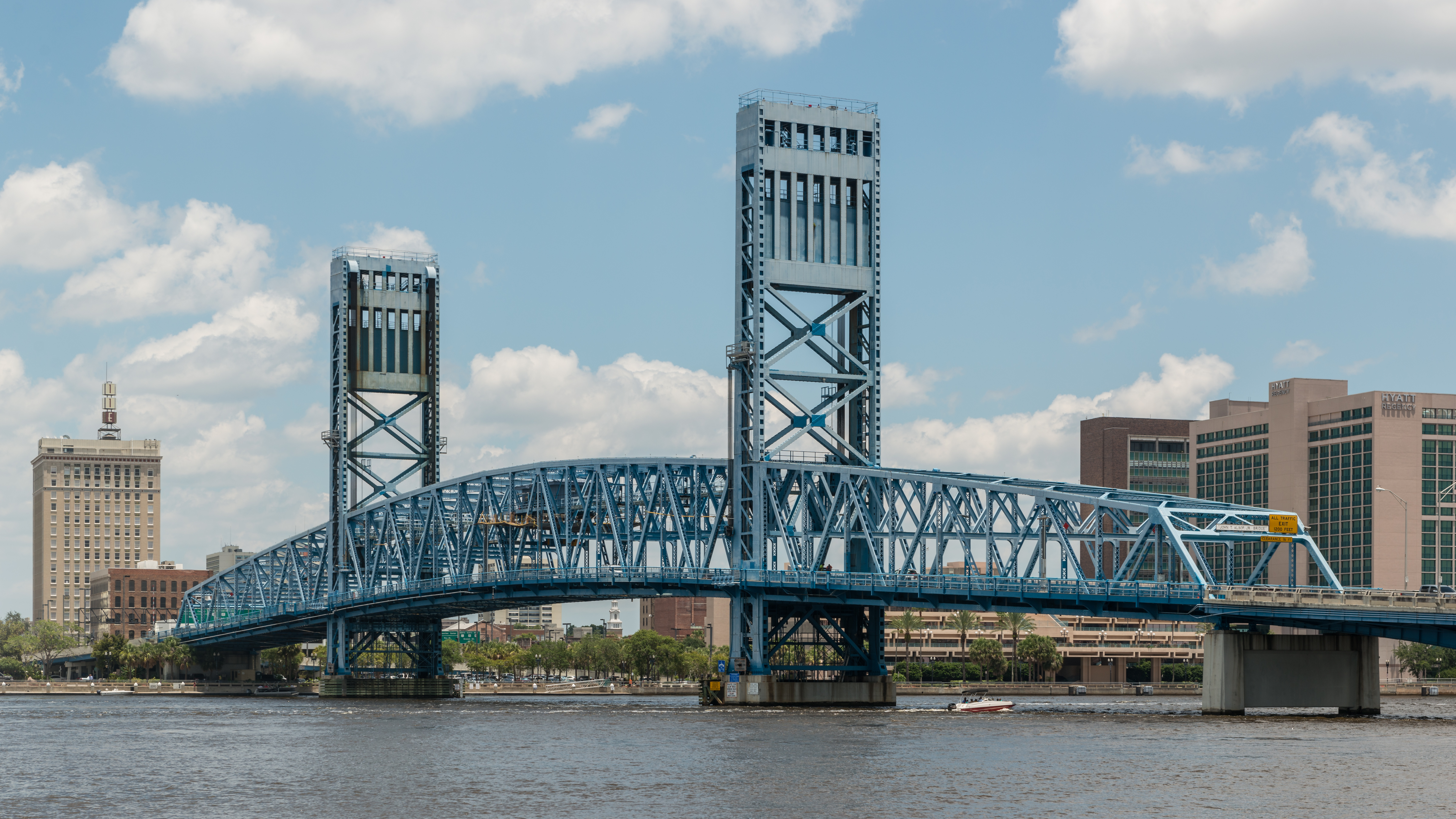
- Viewed from the south bank
- Coordinates: 30.3228°N 81.6586°W
- Carries: four general purpose lanes of (S. Main Street) US 1 / US 90 two sidewalks
- Crosses: St. Johns River
- Locale: Jacksonville, Florida
- Official name: John T. Alsop Jr. Bridge
- Maintained by: Florida Department of Transportation
- ID number: 720022

Characteristics
- Design: steel vertical lift bridge
- Total length: 1,680 feet (510 m)
- Width: 58 feet (18 m)
- Longest span: 365 feet (111 m)
- Clearance above: 16.0 feet (4.9 m)
- Clearance below: 35 feet (11 m) closed 135 feet (41 m) open

History
- Opened: July 1941; 85 years ago

Location
- Interactive map of Main Street Bridge (John T. Alsop Jr. Bridge)

The Main Street Bridge, officially the John T. Alsop Jr. Bridge and nicknamed the Blue Bridge, is a bridge crossing the St. Johns River in Jacksonville, Florida. It was the second bridge built across the river. It carries four lanes of traffic, and is signed as US 1/US 90 (SR 5/SR 10). A lift bridge, it opened in July 1941 at a cost of $1.5 million. In 1957 it was named after Mayor John T. Alsop Jr., but continues to be known, even on road signs, as the Main Street Bridge. It remains one of the most recognizable features of the Downtown Jacksonville skyline.

== History ==
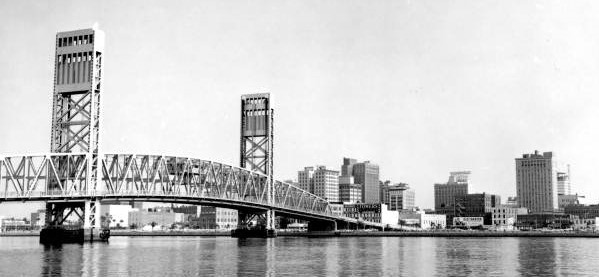
Main Street Bridge in 1962.

Construction of the Main Street Bridge began in 1938 at a cost of $1.5 million by the Mount Vernon Bridge Company. It was permitted by the War Department in 1936 prior to World War II. The Main Street Bridge took three years to be built and had a dedication ceremony on July 17, 1941. The bridge was built as a vertical lift bridge with use of trusses in order to lift up to accommodate ships passing underneath it. The official name of the bridge, John T. Alsop Jr. Bridge, was dedicated in 1957 to former mayor of Jacksonville John T. Alsop. The bridge carries traffic to and from San Marco, Southbank, Downtown Jacksonville and Interstate 95. In 2014 the Main Street Bridge underwent an $11 million renovation to upgrade metal barriers and patch sidewalks.

With other nearby bridges having been rebuilt as fixed spans by around the end of the 20th century, the Main Street Bridge is now the only remaining moveable bridge carrying automobile traffic across the St. Johns River in the Jacksonville area. Of the eight vehicle crossings in the region, four (Shands, Fuller Warren, Acosta and Main St.) had included movable spans when they initially opened.

On January 13, 2026, the Jacksonville City Council unanimously approved a resolution directing city departments to prepare a nomination of the Main Street Bridge for the National Register of Historic Places. The nomination effort coincides with planned Florida Department of Transportation renovations beginning after July 1, 2027.

== Gallery ==
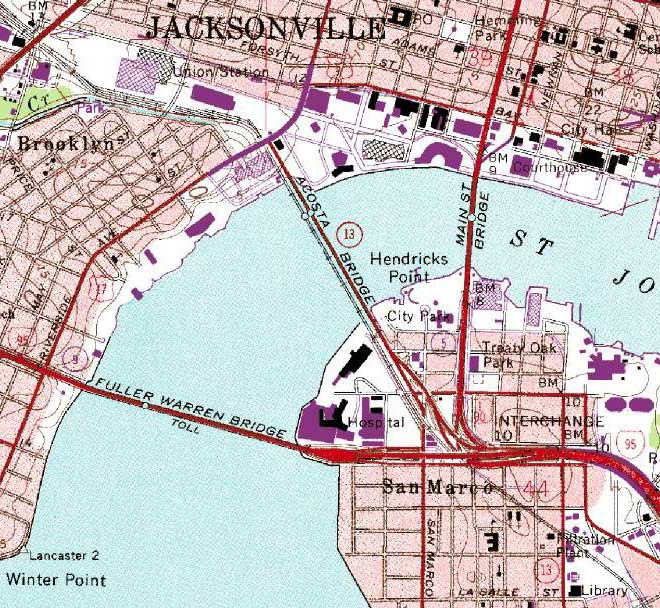
A 1992 map of the Main Street Bridge

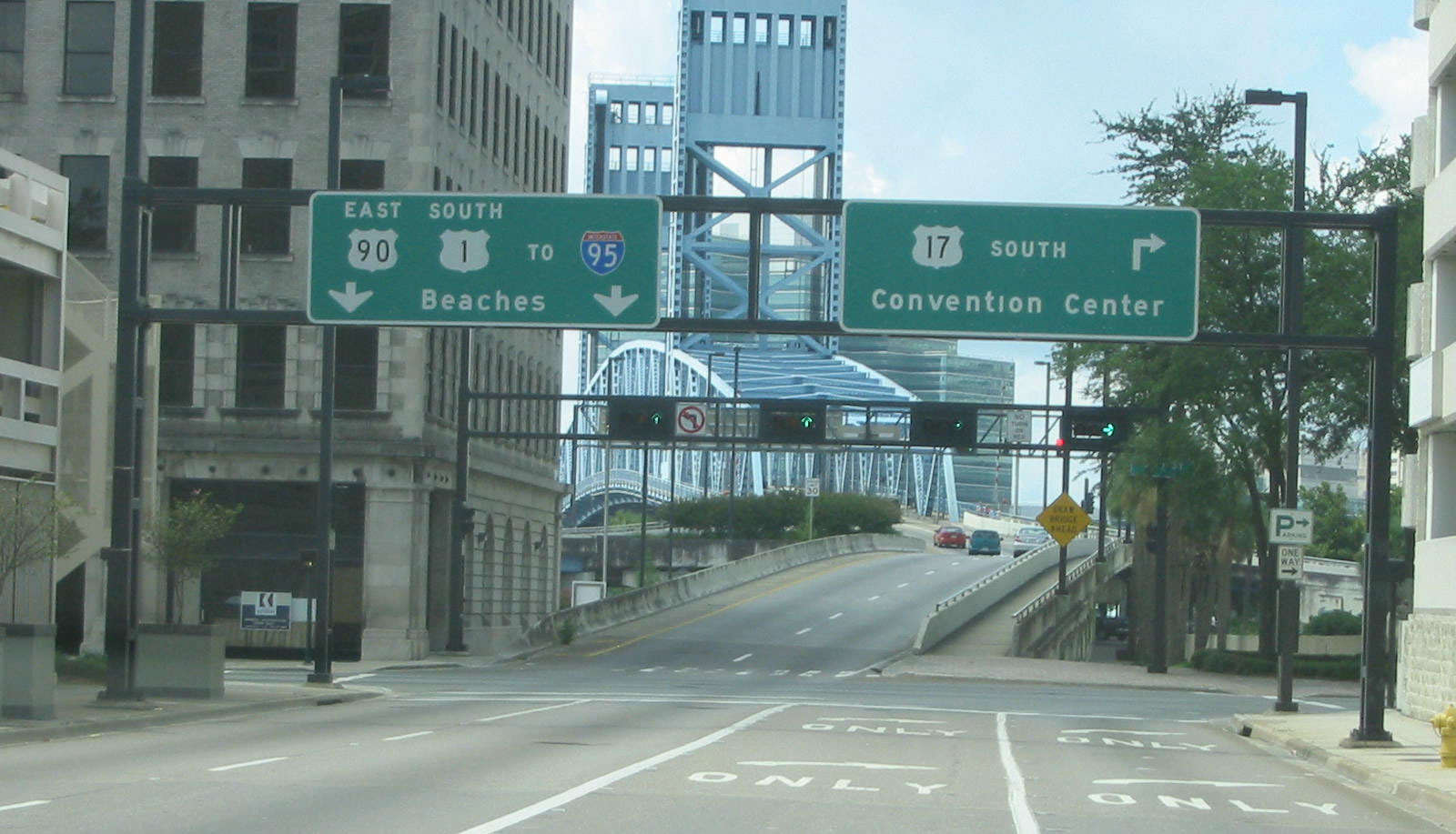
Looking south from downtown along Main Street towards the Main Street Bridge

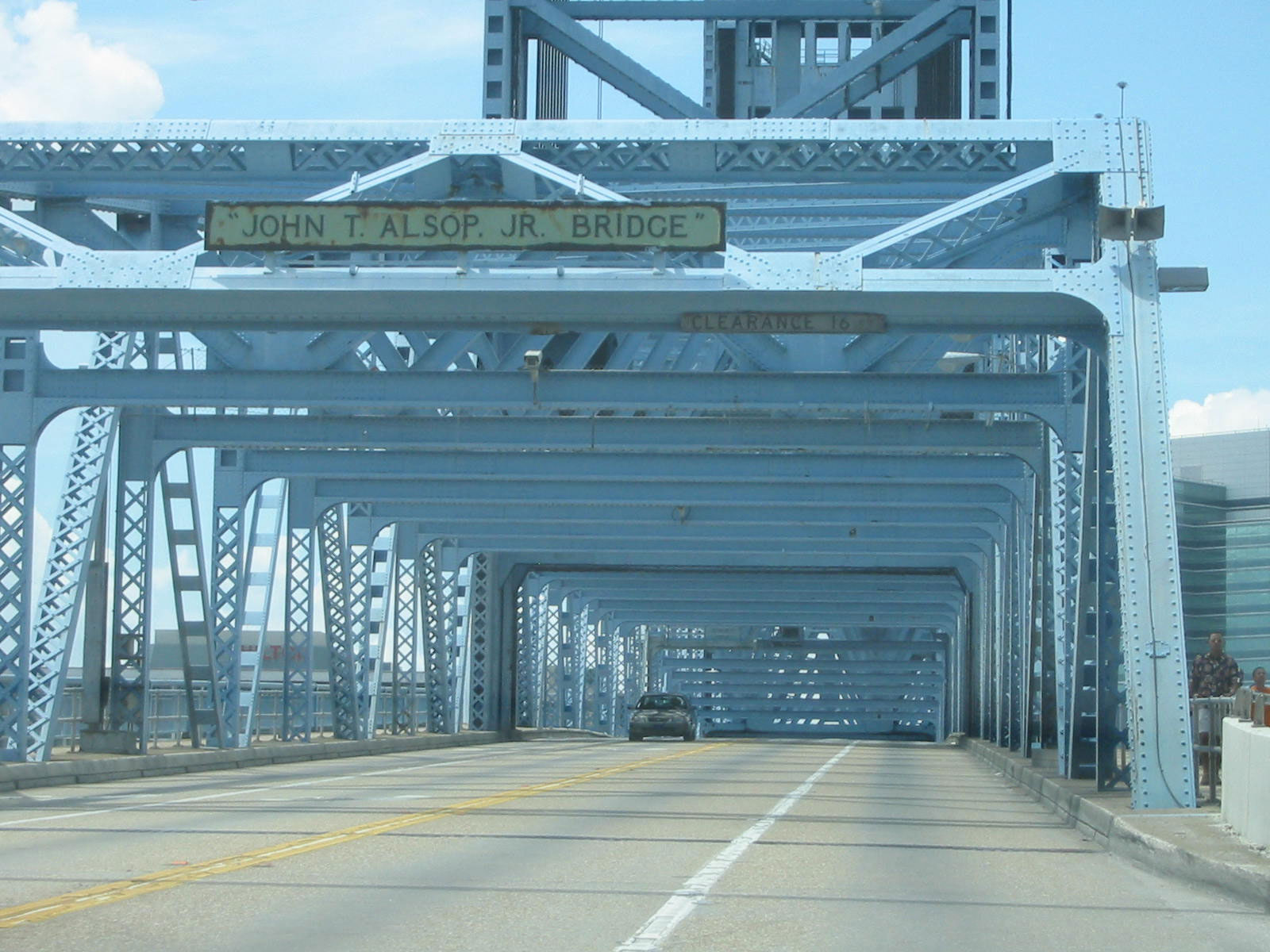
Looking south through the truss of the Main Street Bridge

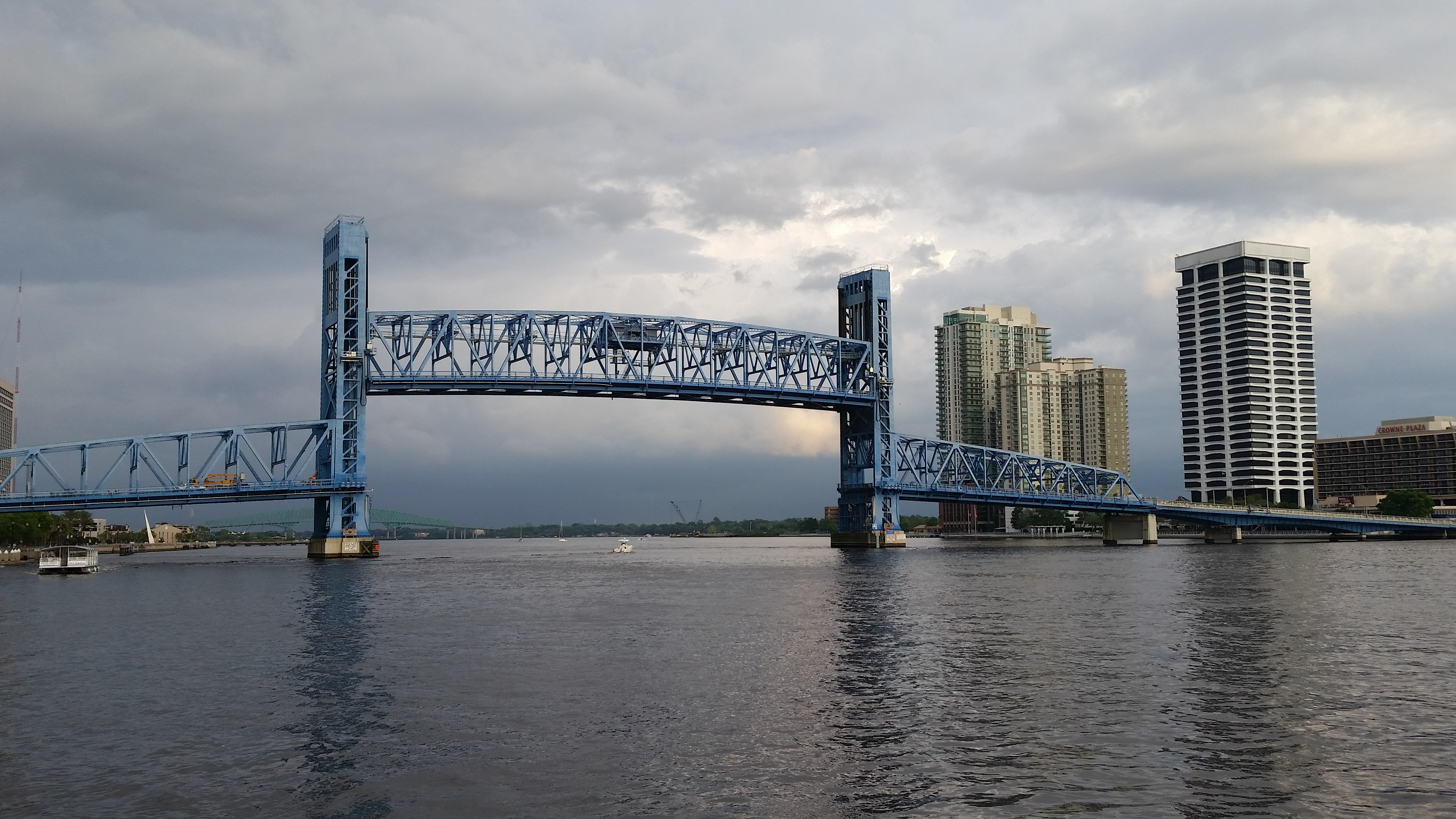
With lift span raised

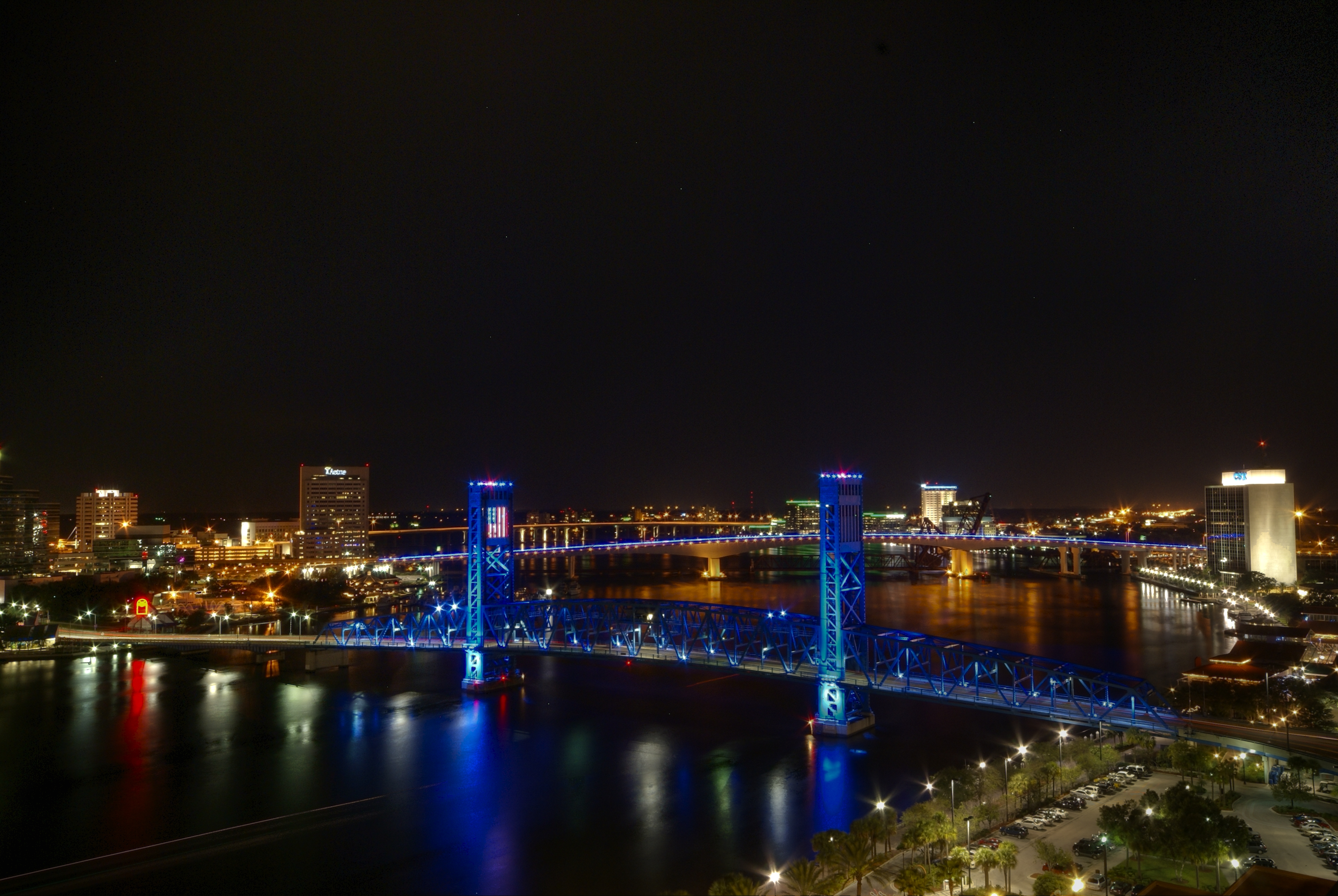
Illuminated at night: View from Hyatt Regency Hotel, with the Acosta Bridge visible in the background

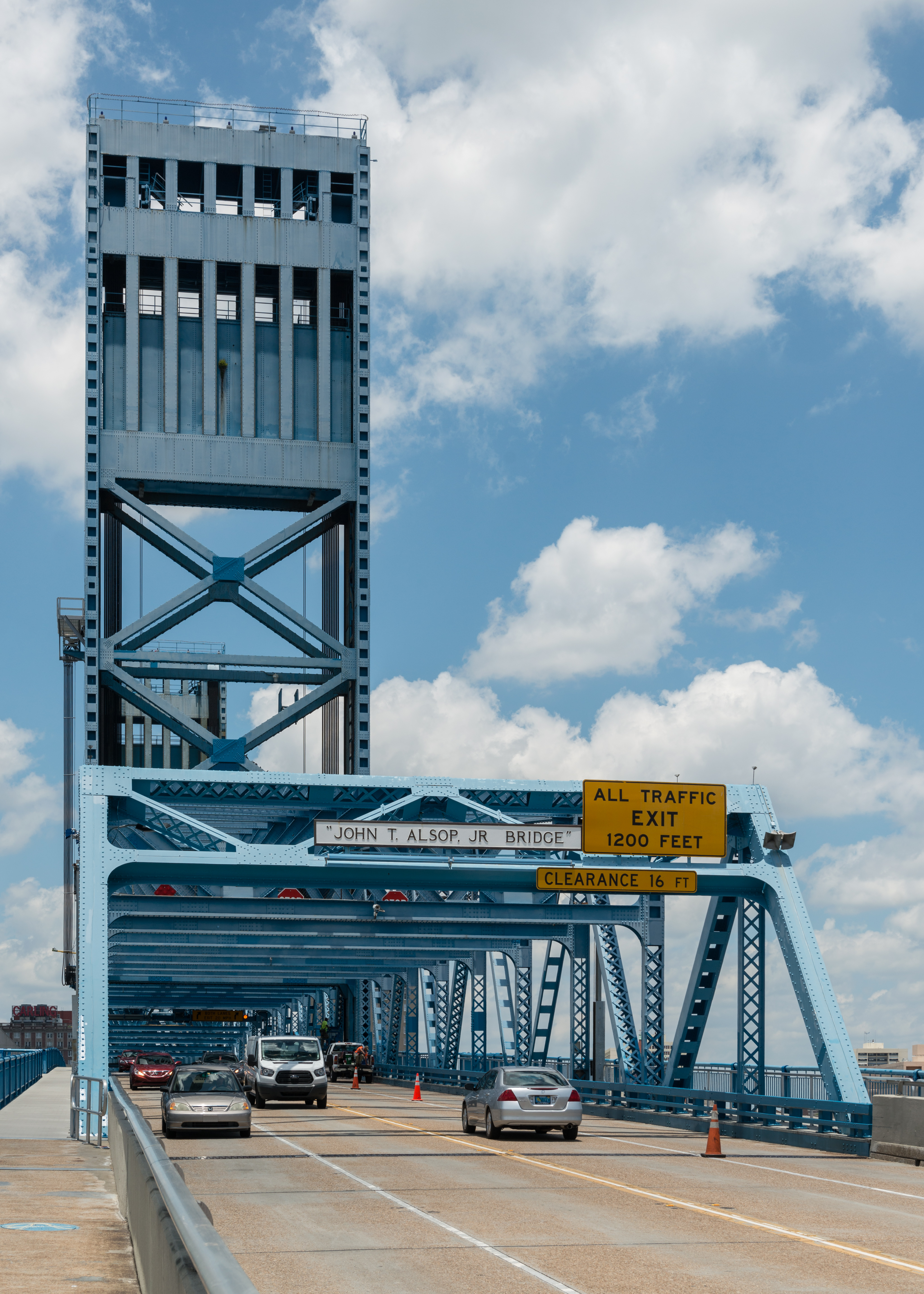
Sidewalk view from the south

The bridge opens on demand except during restricted hours. Restricted hours are 7-8:30am and 4-6:30pm.
