= Joe Karlgaard =

American college athletics administrator (born 1974)

Biographical details
- Born: August 2, 1974 (age 52); Bismarck, North Dakota, U.S.
- Education: Stanford University; University of Minnesota

Playing career

Track & Field
- 1992–1996: Stanford

Administrative career (AD unless noted)
- 2005–2011: Oberlin (DIII)
- 2011–2013: Stanford (Sr. Assoc. AD)
- 2013–2023: Rice

Joe Karlgaard (born August 2, 1974) is an American former college athletics administrator. He was most recently the athletics director at Rice University. Prior to Rice, Karlgaard served as the senior associate athletics director for development at Stanford University and as athletics director at Oberlin College.

== Early life and education ==
Born in Bismarck, North Dakota, Karlgaard attended Stanford University, earning a bachelor's degree in history in 1996. He also ran track and field for the Cardinal, where he lettered all four years. He later received a master's degree and Ph.D. in educational policy and administration from the University of Minnesota.

== Sports administration career ==
Karlgaard began his career as the administrative assistant for the Stanford track and field program and then coached cross country and track at the University of Minnesota. In 2004, he joined his former coach Vin Lananna as an assistant athletics director at Oberlin College.

In 2005, he was named athletics director at Oberlin following the departure of Lananna to coach track and field at the University of Oregon. In 2011, he returned to Stanford as the senior associate athletics director for development. He was named director of athletics at Rice University on September 9, 2013.

Karlgaard is a past chair of the NCAA Division I Baseball Committee, which selects teams to compete in the College World Series. He also served on the LEAD1 Association's Working Group on Diversity, Equity and Inclusion in 2020.

On June 20, 2023, it was announced that Karlgaard was stepping down from his position on August 1 to take a position outside college athletics.

== Personal life ==
Karlgaard and his wife Jill have three sons. His father, Dick, was a former high school athletics director who won the National High School Athletic Coaches Association national athletic director of the year award in 1991. His brother, Rich Karlgaard, is the publisher of Forbes Magazine.
