= Whitehead =

Whitehead may refer to:

- Whitehead (surname), includes a list of people with the name
  - Alfred North Whitehead, a 20th century English mathematician and philosopher
- Whitehead (bird), a small species of passerine bird, endemic to New Zealand
- Whitehead (comedo), a blocked sweat/sebaceous duct of the skin
- Whitehead (patience), a patience game related to Klondike
- Whitehead & Co., a former torpedo company founded by Robert Whitehead in 1875
- Whitehead building, heritage listed residence of the principal of the University of Adelaide's Lincoln College
- Whitehead Eagles F.C., a football club in Northern Ireland, United Kingdom
- Whitehead Institute, a non-profit research institute located in Cambridge, Massachusetts
- Whitehead SpA, one of the names of the later torpedo factory in Livorno
- Whiteheads, another name for the wheat disease take-all
- USS Whitehead (1861–1865), American Civil War, 136-ton screw steam gunboat

== Places ==
- Canada:
  - Rural Municipality of Whitehead, Manitoba
  - Whitehead, Nova Scotia, on Tor Bay
- Hong Kong
  - Whitehead, Hong Kong, a cape at Wu Kai Sha
- Northern Ireland
  - Whitehead, County Antrim, a small town in Northern Ireland
- United States:
  - Lake Whitehead, a reservoir in Napa County, California
  - Whitehead, Mississippi
  - Whitehead Township, Alleghany County, North Carolina
  - Whitehead Island, Maine
