= James Whitehead (cricketer, born 1860) =

English cricketer (1860–1904)

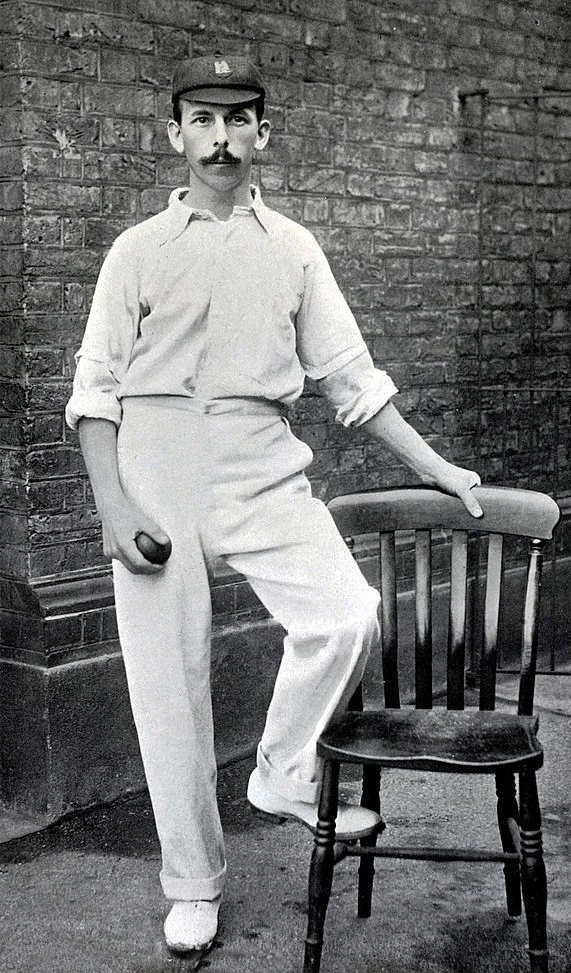

Personal information
- Full name: Stephen James Whitehead
- Born: 2 September 1860; Enfield Highway, Middlesex, England
- Died: 9 June 1904 (aged 43); Small Heath, Birmingham, England
- Batting: Right-handed
- Bowling: Right-arm off-break/medium pace
- Role: Bowler

Domestic team information
- Years: Team
- 1891–92: Liverpool and District
- 1894–1900: Warwickshire
- First-class debut: 18 July 1891 Liverpool and District v Yorkshire
- Last First-class: 11 August 1900 Warwickshire v Yorkshire

Career statistics
Competition	FC
Matches	58
Runs scored	519
Batting average	10.59
100s/50s	–/–
Top score	46*
Balls bowled	10151
Wickets	183
Bowling average	23.93
5 wickets in innings	11
10 wickets in match	4
Best bowling	8/43
Catches/stumpings	34/–
- Source: CricketArchive, 1 December 2015

Stephen James Whitehead (2 September 1860 – 9 June 1904) was an English cricketer who played first-class cricket for Warwickshire between 1894 and 1900 and for Liverpool and District in 1891 and 1892. He was born in Enfield Highway, Middlesex and died at Small Heath, Birmingham.

== Cricket career ==
Whitehead was a right-handed lower-order batsman and a right-arm bowler who could bowl both off-breaks and medium-pace. He was a professional cricketer and had playing and coaching engagements at Oxford, Malvern and Rugby at the time of his death, and was also playing for Stratford-on-Avon Cricket Club. He played for Warwickshire from 1886, but the county's matches were not regarded as first-class until 1894. Among his non-first-class matches for Warwickshire was the first match at the Bristol County Ground at Ashley Down, Bristol against Gloucestershire in which he ended W. G. Grace's first innings on the new ground by bowling him. His first first-class games were for the Liverpool and District side in 1891 and 1892, in matches against Yorkshire which the Liverpool side won in both years.

From 1894, Warwickshire's games against other first-class sides were also considered to be first-class, though the team did not join the County Championship until 1895. In 1894, Whitehead, alongside Henry Pallett, formed part of an extremely successful bowling line-up, and he took five wickets in an innings five times, on four occasions going on to take 10 or more wickets in a match. His best bowling performance came in Warwickshire's first first-class match when he took eight Nottinghamshire wickets for 47 runs; this was the best bowling of his career. He almost equalled that return in the very next game by taking eight Surrey wickets for 49 in the first innings. Whitehead's success brought him selection for one of the representative sides in a non-Test cricket season: he played for A. J. Webbe's XI alongside notables such as Lord Hawke and F. S. Jackson against Cambridge University and took eight wickets in the game. He was, however, unable to sustain this level of performance, though he finished the 1894 season with 73 wickets at the respectable bowling average of 17.17 runs per wicket.

Whitehead was still a front-line bowler for Warwickshire in the inaugural County Championship season for 1895, but was less effective than he had been, and his 42 wickets that season cost an average of 26.61. Thereafter, he played a few matches each season through to 1900, managing at least one decent return in each season, but never taking more than 20 wickets in any one season.

== Death ==
In 1904, Whitehead was awarded a joint benefit match by Warwickshire with Walter Richards, another player whose county career straddled the transition to first-class status; the match selected was the three-day game against Essex, starting on Monday 6 June. Whitehead attended the match and, according to Wisden Cricketers' Almanack, was "apparently in his usual health". A newspaper report later that week, however, states that at the end of the match on the Wednesday evening, "he complained of feeling unwell, but his colleagues thought he was suffering from the effects of excitement". The following day, the newspaper reported, a doctor was called and pronounced that Whitehead had "English cholera", now called dysentery; he died the same evening. Further explanation came from an inquest held the following week: Whitehead, the inquest heard, had drunk some "stale beer" while playing for Stratford Cricket Club on the Saturday preceding his benefit match and that, combined with consumption (tuberculosis), had produced "acute gastro enteritis" which was cited as the cause of death.
