= Weishaupt =

Weishaupt is a German surname. Notable people with the surname include:

- Adam Weishaupt (1748–1830), German philosopher and founder of the Order of Illuminati
- Erich Weishaupt (born 1952), German ice hockey player
- Johann Georg Weishaupt (1717–1753), professor of law at the University of Ingolstadt
- Karl von Weishaupt (1787–1853), Bavarian Lieutenant General and War Minister

== See also ==
- Weißhaupt
