= Henry Whitehead =

Henry Whitehead may refer to:

- J. H. C. Whitehead (1904–1960), British mathematician
- Henry Whitehead (bishop) (1853–1947), Bishop of Madras and father of J. H. C. Whitehead
- Henry Whitehead (priest) (1825–1896), English minister
- Henry Whitehead (MP) (1574–1629), English MP
- Henry S. Whitehead (1882–1932), American writer

== See also ==
- Harry Whitehead (1874–1944), cricketer
- Whitehead (surname)
