= Rich Karlgaard =

American journalist

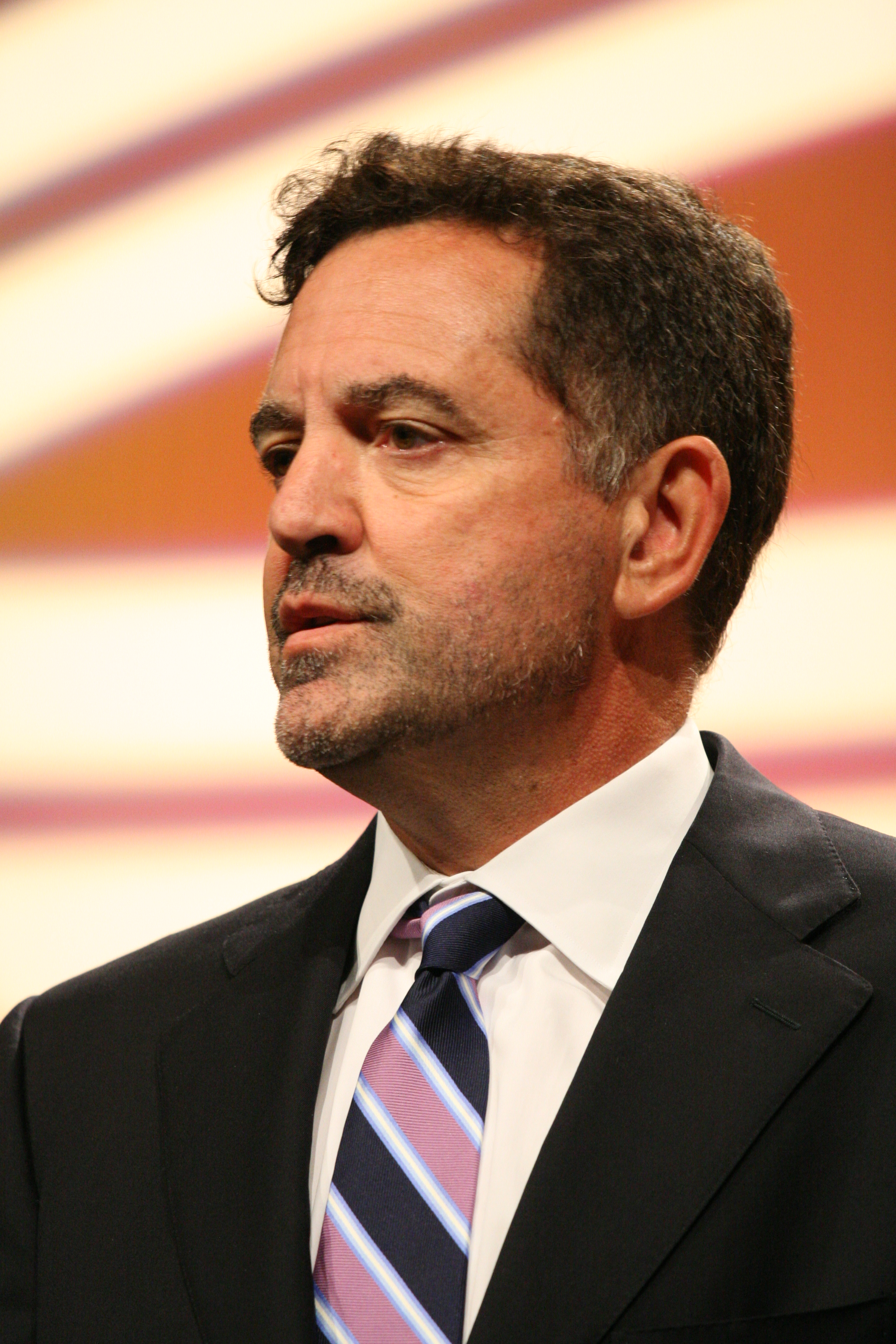
- Karlgaard in 2009
- Born: Bismarck, North Dakota, U.S.
- Education: Bismarck State College; Stanford University (BA)
- Occupations: Author, journalist
- Writing career
- Period: 1989–present
- Notable works: Life 2.0 (2004); The Soft Edge (2014); Late Bloomers (2019)

Rich Karlgaard is an American journalist and author. He was named publisher of Forbes magazine in 1998 and has written three books, Life 2.0: How People Across America Are Transforming Their Lives by Finding the Where of Their Happiness (2004), which made The Wall Street Journal business bestseller list, The Soft Edge: Where Great Companies Find Lasting Success (2014), and Late Bloomers: The Power of Patience in a World Obsessed with Early Achievement (2019).

Karlgaard's books, articles, and speeches often focus on the fundamentals of business, the need for constant innovation, and the importance of building the right corporate culture. He is an advisor at the Forbes School of Business & Technology.

== Early life ==
Karlgaard was born in Bismarck, North Dakota. His father, Dick Karlgaard, was a multi-sport athlete, a physical education teacher, and a coach. He later became athletic director for Bismarck's public school and was twice named national high athletic director of the year. His mother, Pat (Hook) Karlgaard was a homemaker. His only brother, Dr. Joe Karlgaard, is currently the Athletic Director at Rice University.

Karlgaard graduated from Bismarck High in 1972, where he was named a three-year letterman in cross-country and track. He went on to attend Bismarck State College, formerly known as Bismarck Junior College, on a track scholarship and in 1974 competed in the National Junior College indoor championships in the 1,000-yard run. The following year he transferred to Stanford University, and graduated with a B.A. in political science.

== Career ==
After graduating from Stanford, Karlgaard became an editorial assistant at Runner's World magazine. Then in the early 1980s, he became a technical writer for the Electric Power Research Institute and a copywriter at Warr, Foote and Rose ad agency.

In 1985, Karlgaard and Anthony B. Perkins created the Churchill Club, which quickly became known as an organization dedicated to producing programs where "important people say important things." The first speaker was Robert Noyce, the inventor of the integrated circuit and cofounder of Fairchild Semiconductor and Intel. Other speakers have included then Arkansas governor and future United States President Bill Clinton, former CEO of Microsoft Steve Ballmer, and founder of the Huffington Post, Arianna Huffington. The Churchill Club now has over 7,500 members. For this effort, he was named a Northern California winner of the 1997 Ernst & Young Entrepreneur of the Year award.

Karlgaard and Perkins also created Upside Magazine together in 1989. The magazine was designed to be a magazine "for Silicon Valley about Silicon Valley." It was published from 1989 to 2002, and had a circulation of over 300,000 subscribers.

Karlgaard left Upside Magazine in 1992 to start Forbes ASAP, along with Steve Forbes and George Glider. Forbes ASAP attracted well-known writers such as Tom Wolfe, who in 1996 wrote a nine-thousand word essay called "Sorry, But Your Soul Just Died.”

In 1998, Karlgaard was named publisher of Forbes magazine and began writing a column entitled Digital Rules (later renamed Innovation Rules). In 2004, he wrote his first book, Life 2.0. The book was published by Crown Business and made The Wall Street Journal business bestseller list.

In 2013, he began work on his second book, The Soft Edge. The book was published by Jossey-Bass in April 2014 and looks at how companies have thrived in business by creating innovative cultures and balancing what he calls the "Triangle of Company Success".

His third book, Late Bloomers: The Power of Patience in a World Obsessed with Early Achievement, was published by Crown Publishing in April 2019. The book explores what it means to be a late bloomer in a culture obsessed with SAT scores and early success, and how finding one's way later in life can be an advantage to long-term achievement and happiness.

In 2014, he was awarded an honorary doctorate from Northcentral University.

== Personal life ==
Karlgaard lives in Northern California with his wife, Majorie Unsoeld Karlgaard, and two children.

In 2001, Karlgaard earned his private pilot's certificate, and an instrument rating in 2002. That year he flew his Cessna 172 single-engine four-seat airplane around the United States while researching his first book, Life 2.0. Karlgaard has also owned a 2006 Cirrus SR22 single-engine four-seat aircraft.

== Bibliography ==
- Life 2.0: How People Across America Are Transforming Their Lives by Finding the Where of Their Happiness (2004). Crown Business. ISBN 1400046076 and ISBN 978-1400046072
- The Soft Edge: Where Great Companies Find Lasting Success (2014). Jossey-Bass. ISBN 1118829425 and ISBN 978-1118829424
- Late Bloomers: The Power of Patience in a World Obsessed with Early Achievement (2019). Crown Publishing. ISBN 978-1-5247-5975-9 and ISBN 978-1-5247-5976-6
