= Upside (magazine) =

Venture capital magazine

Upside was a San Francisco-based business and technology magazine for venture capitalists. It was published from 1989 to 2002. It had a circulation above 300,000.

== History ==
=== Beginnings ===
Upside was started by banker Anthony B. Perkins and technical writer Rich Karlgaard as a magazine "for Silicon Valley about Silicon Valley." Venture capitalist Tim Draper was the main initial backer, along with Silicon Valley Bank founder Roger Smith and Estée Lauder's grandson Gary Lauder. Jay Whitehead was its Managing Publisher. In its early issues, the publication published controversial articles on investment firms Kleiner Perkins Caufield & Byers and Hambrecht & Quist. Upside quickly became widely read in the Silicon Valley tech community but burned through $3 million between 1989 and 1992 and was constantly trying to raise money.

=== Departure of founders ===
Perkins was removed by the magazine's board of directors as publisher on May 2, 1992. He would go on to start Red Herring, which had a similar focus to Upside. Within a month, Karlgaard left to become editor of Forbes ASAP. Forbes ASAP was originally announced as a joint venture between Forbes and Upside, but Upside was excluded from the venture after the hiring of Karlgaard, and this angered magazine staff.

David Bunnell, an Upside board member and investor and a founder of PC World, Macworld and PC Magazine, was CEO from 1996–2002.

=== Expansion ===
In 1997, The Washington Post Company invested in Upside and announced the two companies would share editorial resources, collaborate online, sponsor conferences together and cooperate on ad sales and circulation development. The Washington Post Company said it selected Upside due to the magazine's tech news and connections in Silicon Valley.

David Bunnell's son Aaron Bunnell joined Upside as a vice president in the late 1990s, in charge of the magazine's website UpsideToday. He struck a crucial deal with Yahoo that doubled traffic and launched a popular feature called "Dot-Com graveyard." Co-workers described him as a hard worker. In summer 2000, he was found dead in a hotel room in New York, where he had traveled to close an UpsideToday business deal. He had reportedly been using drugs, working long hours and grieving the loss of a girlfriend in the weeks leading up to his death.

In January 2001, Upside launched UpsideFN, a New York-based online radio network headed by GM Scott Hunter and J.T. Farley, a former senior producer and news editor for CNBC. UpsideFN closed in May 2001, citing a weak advertising market.

At its peak size in 2001, Upside employed 110 staff.

=== Bankruptcy ===
Upside declared bankruptcy and ceased publication in 2002.
