= John T. Alsop =

American politician (1874–1958)

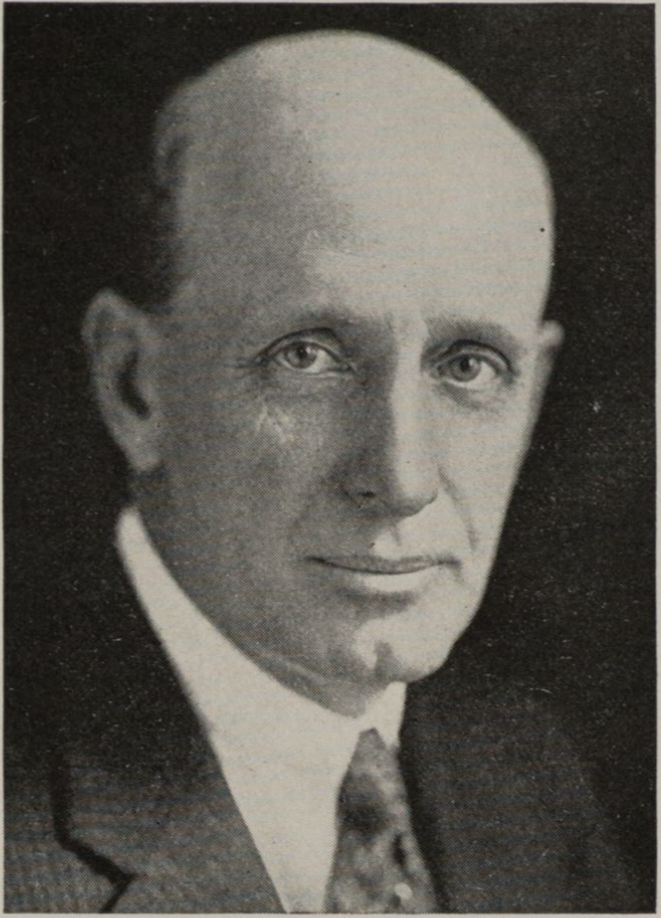
- Alsop, c. 1926

33rd & 35th Mayor of Jacksonville
- In office 1941–1945
- Preceded by: George C. Blume
- Succeeded by: C. Frank Whitehead
- In office 1923–1937
- Preceded by: John W. Martin
- Succeeded by: George C. Blume

Personal details
- Born: John Thomas Alsop Jr. August 10, 1874; Enfield, North Carolina, U.S.
- Died: May 12, 1958 (aged 83); Jacksonville, Florida, U.S.
- Political party: Democratic

John Thomas Alsop Jr. (August 10, 1874 – May 12, 1958) was an American politician. He served as Mayor of Jacksonville, Florida, from 1923 to 1937, and again from 1941 to 1945. His eighteen-year, seven term stint in the mayor's office is the longest in the city's history. Jacksonville's Main Street Bridge, officially the John T. Alsop Jr. Bridge, is named for him.
