= George Whitehead =

George Whitehead may refer to:

- George Whitehead (Quaker leader) (1636–1723), Quaker preacher, author and lobbyist
- George Whitehead (cricketer) (1895–1918), English cricketer
- George Whitehead (rugby union) (born 1989), South African rugby union player
- George W. Whitehead (1918–2004), American mathematician

== See also ==
- George Whitefield (1714–1770), religious figure
- Robert G. Whitehead (Robert George Whitehead, 1916–2007), American businessman
