= Richard Whitehead =

Richard Whitehead may refer to:

- Richard Whitehead (Hampshire MP) (1594–1663), Parliamentary colonel
- Richard Whitehead (athlete) (born 1976), British Paralympic athlete
- Richard G. Whitehead, American dental surgeon

== See also ==
- Richard Whitehead Young (1858–1919), U.S. Army officer and judge in the Philippines
