= Arthur Cawston =

British architect (1857–1894)

Arthur Cawston (4 February 1857 – June 1894) was a British architect and surveyor active in London between the 1870s and 1890s. He is known for late-Victorian ecclesiastical and institutional buildings, notably the Grade II* listed former St Philip's Church in Whitechapel, later St Augustine with St Philip's and now Whitechapel Library, and for his 1893 publication A Comprehensive Scheme for Street Improvements in London.

== Life and career ==
Cawston was born at Clapham Common, Surrey, now in London, on 4 February 1857. He was articled to Habershon & Brock and later worked in the office of Edward I'Anson before establishing an independent practice in London.

His early commissions included a row of shops at Norwood, built in 1880–1881, and stables at Balham Hill, built in 1881. The Building News noted that the Balham Hill stables were exempt from the Metropolitan Building Act. He is also recorded as architect of stables at Ashburn Mews, South Kensington, built in 1883.

Cawston's first ecclesiastical works were the Church of the Ascension, Balham Hill, built in 1883, and St Luke's, Bromley Common, built in 1886. The Survey of London describes both as plain Early English red-brick buildings that anticipated his later work at Whitechapel.

== Principal works ==
=== St Philip's Church, Whitechapel ===
St Philip's Church, Newark Street, Whitechapel, was built in 1888–1892 and consecrated on 27 October 1892. The church, later St Augustine with St Philip's, stands behind the former Royal London Hospital. Historic England describes it as an Early English-style red-brick church with Ancaster stone dressings, brick intersecting vaults, an apsidal chancel with ambulatory, an apsidal Lady Chapel and a west porch intended as the base of an unbuilt tower.

The church was declared redundant in 1979 and converted into a medical and dental library for the London Hospital Medical College in 1985–1988. It was opened as Whitechapel Library by Anne, Princess Royal, on 21 November 1988. The building is Grade II* listed.

=== British Home and Hospital for Incurables ===
The British Home and Hospital for Incurables, an institution founded in 1861, moved from Clapham Rise to a purpose-built hospital on Crown Lane, Streatham, in 1894. The Crown Lane buildings were designed by Cawston in a domestic Tudor-Jacobean red-brick style. Cawston died in a shooting accident in June 1894, before the hospital was opened by the Princess of Wales on 3 July 1894.

=== Paddockhurst, Sussex ===
A single-storey music-room wing at Paddockhurst, now Worth Abbey, near Turners Hill in Sussex, was built for the torpedo inventor Robert Whitehead in 1883. The wing bears Whitehead's initials, "R.W.", and survives as the Whitehead Room. The attribution to Cawston rests on later secondary accounts. Historic England's Bedford Lemere daybooks also list model-farm buildings at Paddockhurst under his name; these buildings were later replaced, probably by Aston Webb.

== London street-improvement scheme ==
In 1893 Cawston published A Comprehensive Scheme for Street Improvements in London, accompanied by Maps and Sketches through Edward Stanford. The book set out proposals for large-scale metropolitan street improvements and included maps and sketches. A later account by London historian Peter Berthoud described the scale of Cawston's vision as "immense", while noting that the scheme had little influence on London planning.

== Selected works ==
- Row of shops, Norwood, London, 1880–1881.
- Stables, Balham Hill, London, 1881.
- Church of the Ascension, Balham Hill, London, 1883.
- Stables, Ashburn Mews, South Kensington, London, 1883.
- Music-room wing, Paddockhurst, Sussex, 1883.
- St Luke's, Bromley Common, London, 1886.
- St Philip's Church, Whitechapel, London, 1888–1892; later St Augustine with St Philip's and now Whitechapel Library; Grade II* listed.
- Model-farm buildings, Paddockhurst Estate, Sussex; recorded in the Bedford Lemere daybooks and later replaced.
- British Home and Hospital for Incurables, Crown Lane, Streatham, opened 1894.

== Publications ==
- Cawston, Arthur (1893). A Comprehensive Scheme for Street Improvements in London Accompanied by Maps and Sketches. London: Edward Stanford.

== Death ==
Cawston died in June 1894 in a shooting accident, before the completion of the British Home and Hospital for Incurables at Crown Lane.
