= Weisskopf =

Weißkopf, Weisskopf, Weiskopf are surnames of the following notable people:

- Alison Weisskopf (1960–2018), British archaeologist
- Bob Weiskopf (1914–2001), American screenwriter and producer
- Edmond Weiskopf (1911–1996), Hungarian-born French footballer
- Franz Carl Weiskopf (1900–1955), Prague-born German-speaking writer
- Gustav Weißkopf, birthname of Gustave Whitehead (1874–1927), aviation pioneer
- Kim Weiskopf (1947–2009), American television writer
- Martin C. Weisskopf (1942–2026), American astrophysicist
- Michael Weisskopf (born 1946), American journalist
- Mikhail Weiskopf (born 1948), Israeli philologist, literary scholar, Slavist, translator and commentator of biblical texts
- Tom Weiskopf (1942–2022), American professional golfer
- Toni Weisskopf (born 1965), American science fiction editor and the publisher of Baen Books
- Victor Frederick Weisskopf (1908–2002), Austrian-born American theoretical physicist

== See also ==
- 17050 Weiskopf (1999 FX45), main-belt asteroid discovered in 1999
