= Elizabeth Whitehead (artist) =

English painter

- Born: 21 November 1854; Royal Leamington Spa, England
- Died: 18 June 1934 (aged 79); Royal Leamington Spa, England
- Known for: painting

Elizabeth Whitehead (21 November 1854 – 18 June 1934) was an English painter known for her flower paintings. Her work is in the public collections of the Leamington Spa Art Gallery & Museum and Russell-Cotes Art Gallery & Museum in England and the Musée d'Orsay in Paris.

Whitehead was born in Royal Leamington Spa in 1854, the Whitehead family lived at 3 Lansdowne Terrace. She studied at the Leamington School of Art then travelled to Paris with her brother Frederick Whitehead to attend the Académie Julian. She exhibited at the Royal Academy of Arts and the Society of British Artists.

Whitehead died in Leamington on 18 June 1934.
