= Richard G. Whitehead =

American dental surgeon

Richard G. Whitehead is an American dental surgeon who has been designated as Southern Virginia University's interim president.

Whitehead has an associate degree from Dixie State College of Utah, a bachelor's degree from Brigham Young University and a DDS from Creighton University. He did an internship at the University of Maryland. Starting in 1997 he was head of institutional advancement at Dixie State College. He later served as a mission president for the Church of Jesus Christ of Latter-day Saints and then became a vice president for institutional advancement at Southern Virginia University.

== Sources ==
- Deseret News June 10, 2011
