= James Whitehead (physician) =

English physician

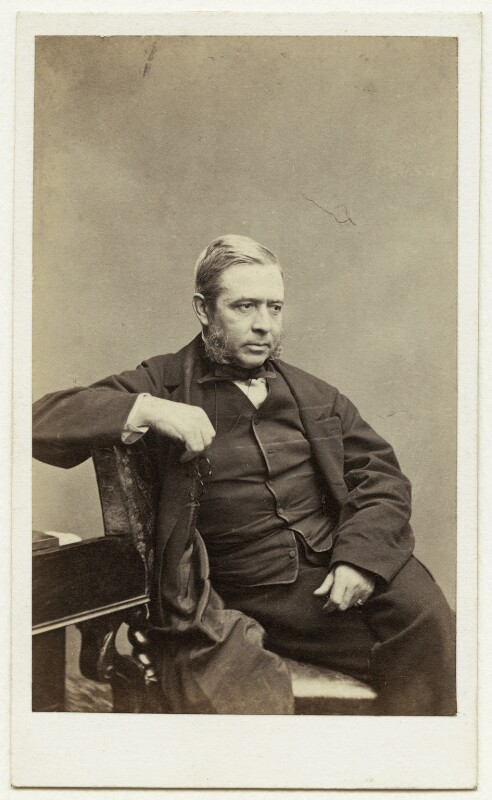
- Born: 1812; Oldham
- Died: 9 April 1885 (aged 72–73)
- Occupation: Physician

James Whitehead (1812 – 9 April 1885) was an English physician.

== Biography ==
Whitehead was born at Oldham in 1812. He was the son of John Whitehead, who had a wide reputation in the district as a herbalist and dealer in simples. James, after working as a boy in a cotton-mill, attended the Marsden Street school of medicine in Manchester, and was a pupil first of Mr. Clough of Lever Street, and afterwards of Mr. Lambert of Thirsk. He was admitted a licentiate of the Society of Apothecaries of London on 11 September 1834, and on 15 December 1835 he became a member of the College of Surgeons. He was admitted a fellow of the College of Surgeons after examination on 14 August 1845. He graduated M.D. at the university of St. Andrews in 1850, and he became a member of the Royal College of Physicians of London in 1859.

Whitehead visited France and Germany in 1836, and on his return to England in 1838 he began to practise his profession in Oxford Street, Manchester. In 1842 he was appointed demonstrator of anatomy at the Marsden Street school of medicine, and in the same year he married Elizabeth, daughter of Thomas Hayward Radcliffe, who died on 20 Sept. 1844. In 1856 he founded, jointly with Dr. Schoepf Merei, the Clinical Hospital and Dispensary for Children, which became subsequently the Manchester Clinical Hospital for Women and Children. He was lecturer on obstetrics at the Royal School of Medicine, and for fifteen years he acted as surgeon to St. Mary's Hospital for Women and Children. In 1851 he moved into Mosley Street, where he conducted a large practice until 1881, when he retired to live on an estate he had purchased at Sutton in Surrey. He died, after a long illness, on 9 April 1885, and is buried in the Ardwick cemetery, Manchester.

Whitehead's works were:

- ‘On the Causes and Treatment of Abortion and Sterility,’ London, 1847, 8vo; republished in America, 1848.
- ‘On the Transmission from Parent to Offspring of some Forms of Disease,’ London, 1851, 8vo; 2nd edit. 1857.
- ‘The Wife's Domain, by Philothalos,’ 1860, 8vo; 2nd edit. 1874.
- ‘Notes on the Rate of Mortality in Manchester,’ 1863, 8vo.
- Jointly with Dr. Merei, a report on children's diseases, being the first ‘Report of the Clinical Hospital,’ Manchester, 1856, 8vo.
