= William Whitehead =

William Whitehead or Bill Whitehead may refer to:

- William Whitehead (poet) (1715–1785), English poet and playwright; Poet Laureate in 1757
- William Adee Whitehead (1810–1884), historian who assisted in the development of Key West, Florida
- William Whitehead (Canadian writer) (1931–2018), Canadian writer, actor and filmmaker
- William Whitehead (organist) (born 1970), English concert organist
- Willie Whitehead (born 1973), American football player
- Bill Whitehead, editor-in-chief at E. P. Dutton, namesake of the Bill Whitehead Award
- Bill Whitehead (1931–2021), New Zealand rugby league administrator
- Dr. William Riddick Whitehead, battlefield surgeon and prominent early figure in Denver's medical community, owner of Peabody-Whitehead Mansion
