= Weißhaupt =

Weißhaupt or Weisshaupt is a German surname. Notable people with the surname include:

- Marco Weißhaupt (born 1972), German footballer
- Pamela Weisshaupt (born 1979), Swiss rower

== See also ==
- Weishaupt
