= John Whitehead =

John Whitehead may refer to:

== In business and government ==
- John Meek Whitehead (1852–1924), American politician in Wisconsin
- John C. Whitehead (1922–2015), American banker and civil servant
- John Whitehead (diplomat) (1932–2013), British diplomat and businessman
- John Whitehead (economist), secretary of the New Zealand Treasury
- John L. Whitehead, member of the Virginia House of Delegates

== In sport ==
- John Whitehead (footballer) (fl. 1890s), English footballer
- John Whitehead (baseball) (1909–1964), American baseball player for the Chicago White Sox
- John Whitehead (American football) (1924–2002), American football coach
- John Whitehead (cricketer) (1925–2000), English cricketer

== Other people ==
- John Whitehead (theologian), 15th-century Irish theologian
- John Whitehead (architect) (1726–1802), English architect and amateur engineer, designer of the Factory House in Porto
- John Whitehead (physician) (1740–1804), English physician and lay preacher; biographer of John Wesley
- John Whitehead (explorer) (1860–1899), British explorer
- J. H. C. Whitehead (1904–1960), British mathematician
- John B. Whitehead (1872–1954), American electrical engineer and a professor at Johns Hopkins University
- John L. Whitehead Jr. (1924–1992), American military and test pilot
- John Whitehead (singer) (1948–2004), American singer and one-half of the duo McFadden & Whitehead
- John M. Whitehead (soldier) (1823-1909), American chaplain and Medal of Honor recipient
- John W. Whitehead, constitutional attorney and conservative author, founder of the Rutherford Institute in 1982

== See also ==
- Jonathan Whitehead (born 1960), composer
