= Alison Weisskopf =

British archaeologist and phytolith researcher

Alison Ruth Weisskopf
- Born: 1960
- Died: 11 January 2018 (aged 57–58)
- Occupation: Archaeologist

Academic background
- Education: University College London
- Thesis: Vegetation, agriculture and social change in Neolithic north central China, a phytolith study (2010)
- Doctoral advisor: Arlene Rosen

Academic work
- Discipline: Archaeobotany
- Sub-discipline: Phytolith analysis
- Institutions: University College London

Alison Weisskopf (1960–2018) was a British-German archaeologist specialising in archaeobotany, specifically the analysis of ancient phytoliths.

== Education and career ==
Weisskopf studied at the UCL Institute of Archaeology as a mature student. She was awarded her bachelor's degree in 2003, writing a dissertation on phytoliths from the Bronze Age site of Krasnoe Smarskoe in the Samara Valley in Russia. She went on to obtain a master's degree in palaeoecology of human societies in 2005, again analysing phytoliths as well as macro-botanical remains for her dissertation research, on the Neolithic site of Sanganakallu in Deccan, India. Her doctoral thesis was titled Vegetation, agriculture and social change in Neolithic north central China, a phytolith study. It was published in the British Archaeological Reports series in 2014.

After obtaining her PhD in 2010, Weisskopf held a series of research positions at the UCL Institute of Archaeology, working on the origins of evolution of rice agriculture in East and Southeast Asia.

Weisskopf was diagnosed with late stage cancer in 2010 and died on 11 January 2018.

== Selected publications ==
- Fuller, D Q and Weisskopf, A R 2011 The Early Rice Project: from Domestication to Global Warming. Archaeology International, 13(14): 44–51. DOI: https://doi.org/10.5334/ai.1314
- Fuller, D Q, Weisskopf, A R and Castillo, C C 2016 Pathways of Rice Diversification across Asia. Archaeology International, 19: 84–96. DOI: https://doi.org/10.5334/ai.1915
- Weisskopf, A R 2014 Millets, Rice and Farmers: Phytoliths as Indicators of Agricultural, Social and Ecological Change in Neolithic and Bronze Age Central China. BAR International Series 2589. Oxford: Archaeopress.
- Weisskopf, A R, Harvey, E, Kingwell-Banham, E, Kajale, M, Mohanty, R, and Fuller, D Q 2014 Archaeobotanical implications of phytolith assemblages from cultivated rice systems, wild rice stands and macro-regional patterns. Journal of Archaeological Science, 51: 43–53. DOI: https://doi.org/10.1016/j.jas.2013.04.026
- Weisskopf, A R, Qin, L, Ding, J, Ding, P, Sun, G and Fuller, D Q 2015 Phytoliths and rice: from wet to dry and back again in the Neolithic Lower Yangtze. Antiquity, 89(347): 1051–1063. DOI: https://doi.org/10.15184/aqy.2015.94
