= David Whitehead =

David Whitehead may refer to:

- David Whitehead (businessman) (1790–1865), American businessman
- David Whitehead (climate scientist), Fellow of the Royal Society Te Apārangi
- David Whitehead (priest) (c. 1492–1571), English evangelical priest
- David Whitehead (soldier) (1896–1992), Australian Army officer
