= Jay Whitehead =

American publisher

Jay Whitehead (born 1959) is an American author, publisher, and entrepreneur known for co-founding Corporate Responsibility Officer (CRO) magazine. He has served as Senior Vice President of Asure Software since 2025.

== Early life and education ==
Whitehead was born in 1959. He holds a Bachelor of Arts in history from the University of California, Los Angeles (UCLA) and a certificate in Strategic Finance from Harvard Business School.

== Career ==
Early in his career, Whitehead worked as a news writer and reporter at KTTV in 1981. In 1983, he joined Apple's advertising agency, Chiat/Day, where he worked on the marketing for the Apple Lisa computer.

In the late 1980s, Whitehead served as publisher of Upside, a magazine focused on the venture capital industry. During the 1990s, he founded Human Resources Outsourcing Today (later HRO Today) magazine and the HRO World conference series.

In 2006, Whitehead co-founded Corporate Responsibility Officer (CRO) magazine. As its publisher and CEO, he oversaw the "100 Best Corporate Citizens" list, an annual ranking of companies based on environmental, social, and governance (ESG) metrics. Whitehead also co-founded the Corporate Responsibility Officers Association.

From 2012 to 2014, Whitehead was the CEO of Charity Partners, Inc., which operated Tickets-for-Charity and formed a partnership with Major League Baseball. In 2016, he and his wife, Anne-Sophie Whitehead, co-founded League Network, a public-benefit company that provides a platform and magazine to support youth sports leagues.

In 2021, Whitehead became chief technology officer and later chairman and CEO of ReentryCenters.com, a company providing services for formerly incarcerated individuals. Under his tenure, the company developed the ReentryPay banking platform and the ReentryApp for GPS monitoring, and it acquired League Network in 2022.

In 2025, Whitehead was appointed as Senior Vice President of Asure Software to lead its AsurePay payroll services division.

During his career, he has held advisory roles at several companies and has served on the board of Harvard's Sustainability and Environmental Management program.

== Personal life ==
Whitehead is married to Anne-Sophie Whitehead, and they have two children.

== Books ==
- The Post-Carbon Economy (2009)
- Reentry Leader (2023)
