= George Whitehead (cricketer) =

English cricketer

George William Edendale Whitehead (27 August 1895 – 17 October 1918) was an English cricketer. He was educated at Clifton College. He was a right-handed batsman and a leg-break bowler. He was born in Bromley and died in Lauwe.

Whitehead made two first-class appearances during August 1914 as part of a trial with Kent County Cricket Club, first as an upper-order batsman, and then in the middle-order. He managed to score a total of 12 runs over the course of his four innings for the club.

Having joined the Royal Field Artillery and attaining the rank of Lieutenant, Whitehead was killed towards the end of the First World War at the age of 23. He is buried at the Harlebeke New British Cemetery in Belgium.

His brother, James, played a single first-class match for the Marylebone Cricket Club in 1912.

== Bibliography ==
- Carlaw, Derek (2020). Kent County Cricketers, A to Z: Part One (1806–1914) (PDF). Cardiff: ACS.
