= Alan Whitehead (disambiguation) =

Alan Whitehead (born 1950) is a British Member of Parliament.

Alan Whitehead may also refer to:

- Alan Whitehead (cricketer) (born 1940), English cricketer and umpire
- Alan Whitehead (drummer) (born 1945), drummer with the 1960s band Marmalade
- Alan Whitehead (footballer, born 1951), English football defender for Birmingham City in the early 1970s
- Alan Whitehead (footballer, born 1956), English football defender for clubs including Bury, Brentford and Scunthorpe United in the late 1970s and 1980s
