= Joseph Whitehead =

Joseph Whitehead may refer to:

- Joseph Whitehead (Canadian politician) (1814–1894), Canadian railway pioneer and politician
- Joseph Whitehead (Coca-Cola bottler) (1864–1906), lawyer, co-founder of the Coca-Cola Bottling Company
- Joseph Whitehead (Virginia politician) (1867–1938), lawyer, politician, member of the US House of Representatives from Virginia
- Joseph Whitehead (sculptor) (1868–1951), English sculptor and stonemason
- Joe Whitehead, actor in The Purple Monster Strikes
