= Frederick Whitehead =

English painter (1853–1938)

Frederick William Newton Whitehead (also known as Fred Whitehead; 1853 – 12 February 1938) was an English landscape artist and illustrator.

== Life and work ==
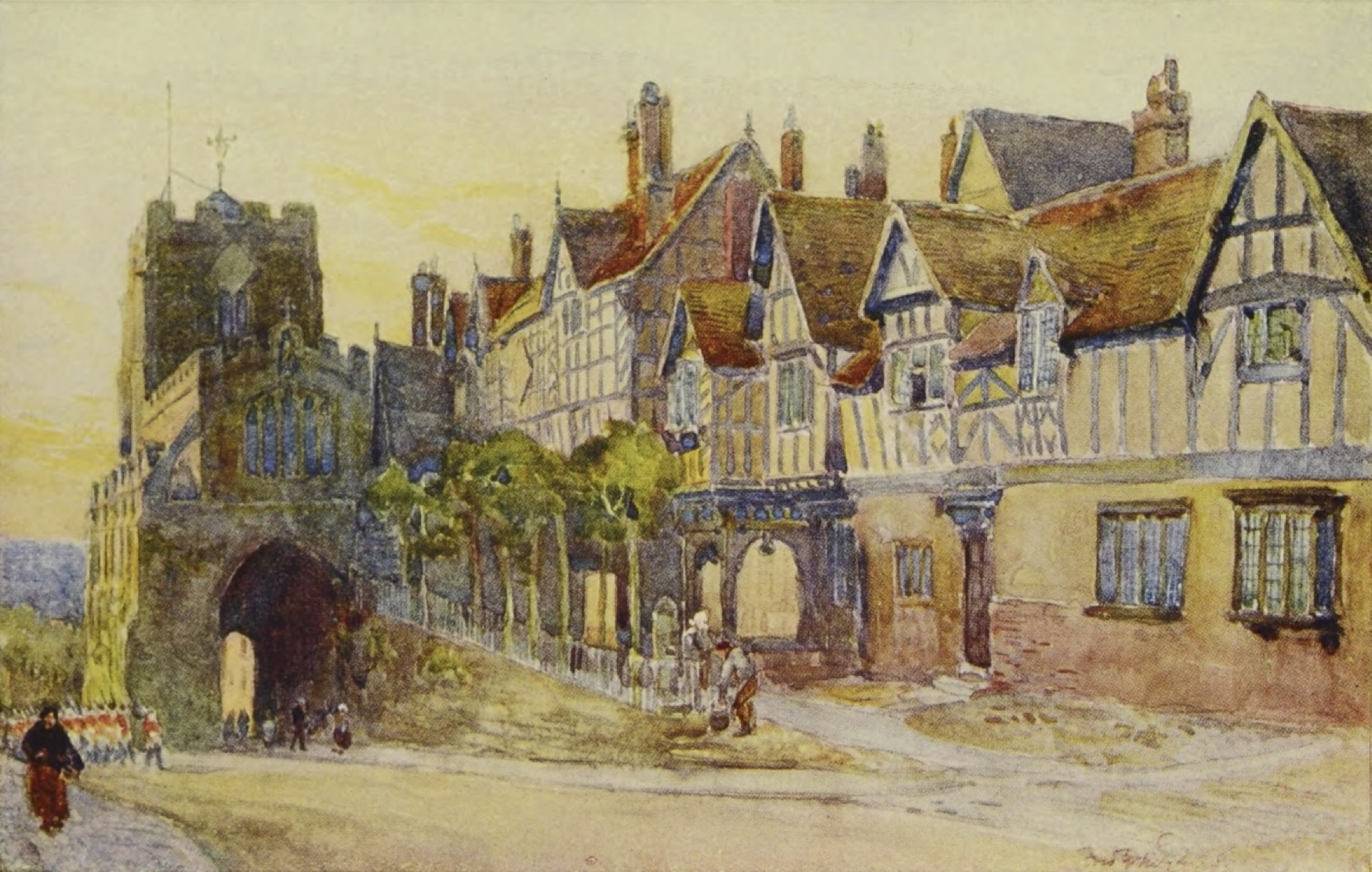
Lord Leycester Hospital, Warwick (from "Warwickshire, the land of Shakespeare")

Whitehead was born in Leamington Spa in 1853, the eldest child of William and Hannah Whitehead. The Whitehead family had lived in Leamington from the late eighteenth century and were bricklayers or farmers. William Whitehead, however, carried out an apprenticeship and set up business as a ‘Carver & Gilder, Picture Dealer, Restorer and Artists’ Colourman’. The Whitehead’s family home at 5 Lansdowne Terrace was also the business premises and studio. Well established Leamington artists, including Thomas Baker (1808–1864), sold their work through the studio.

Frederick grew up surrounded by strong artistic influences. When he was still a child the Irish artist Richard Rothwell (1800–1868) came to stay at Lansdowne Terrace and gave Frederick his first lessons in drawing and painting. Later he received tuition from John Burgess (1813–1874), one of the town’s foremost artists. Despite these lessons with Burgess, Whitehead’s early work was more noticeably influenced by Thomas Baker in both subject matter and style.

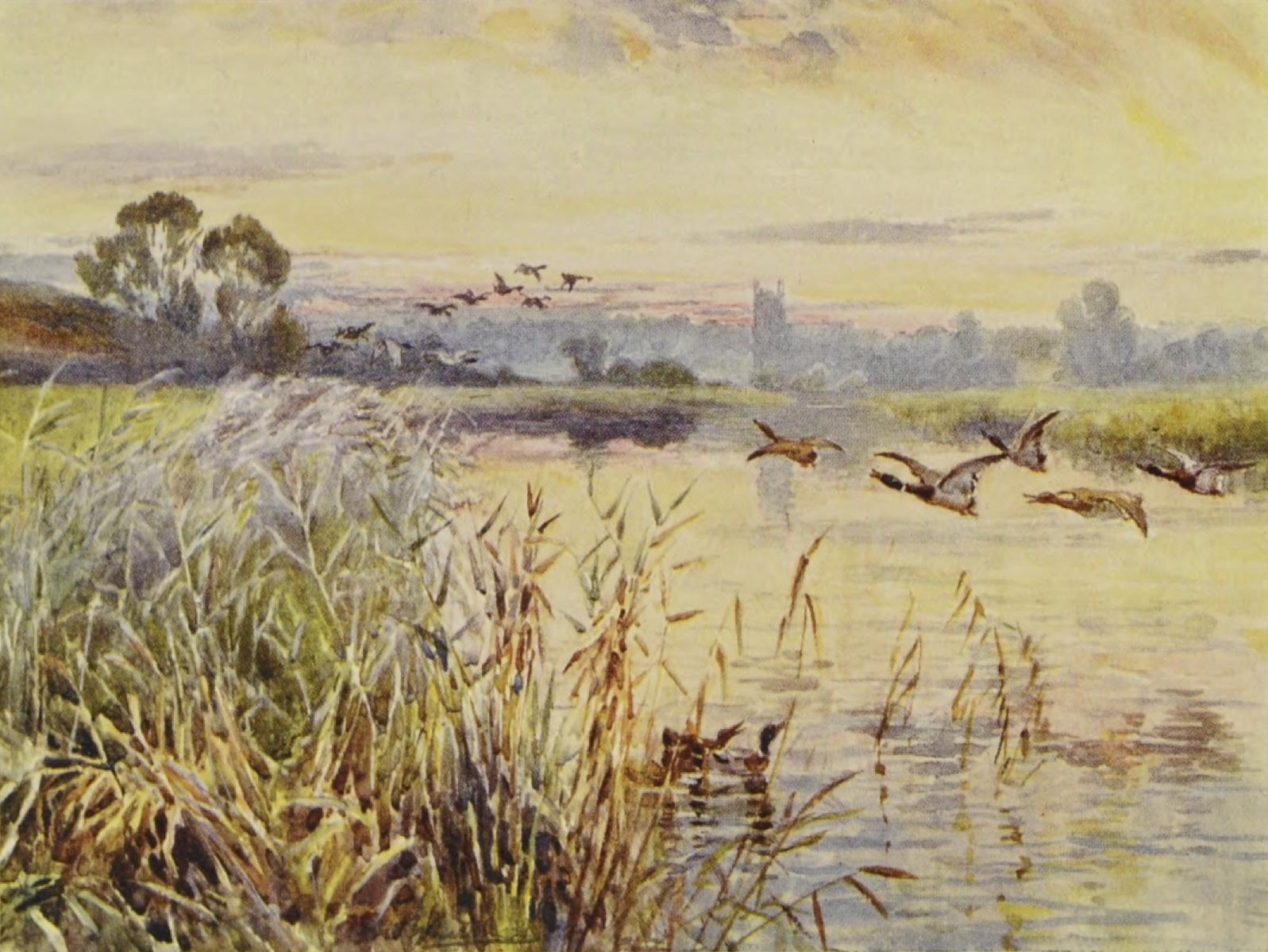
Salford Priors (from "Warwickshire, the land of Shakespeare")

Frederick attended the Leamington School of Art, with his sister Elizabeth Whitehead, before they both travelled to France in 1880. There studied at the Académie Julian in the Saint-Denis district of Paris for three years under Jules Joseph Lefebvre (1836–1911) and Gustave Boulanger (1824–1888). Classes were only held in the winter. During the summer months, Frederick and his sister would travel and paint together in the French countryside. It is thought that his time in France established in him the importance of painting in the open air and observing all the changes in nature.

On returning to England, Whitehead he continued to travel but settled for a time in Dorset. It was here that he met and began a lifelong friendship with the writer, Thomas Hardy. He also met his future wife Beatrice Case who was a local celebrity in her own right, well known for her singing voice and expertise on the piano. Through their long and happy marriage they spent winters in London and returned to Dorset in the summer months.

Frederick and his sister Elizabeth became well known in the Dorset countryside, travelling with their two dogs and their caravan "The Rambler". Living in this way meant that Frederick could immerse himself in nature. He painted close by the caravan or travelled further a-field with a small portable studio called "the Baby Elephant". He painted using watercolours and oils and etched "on the spot".

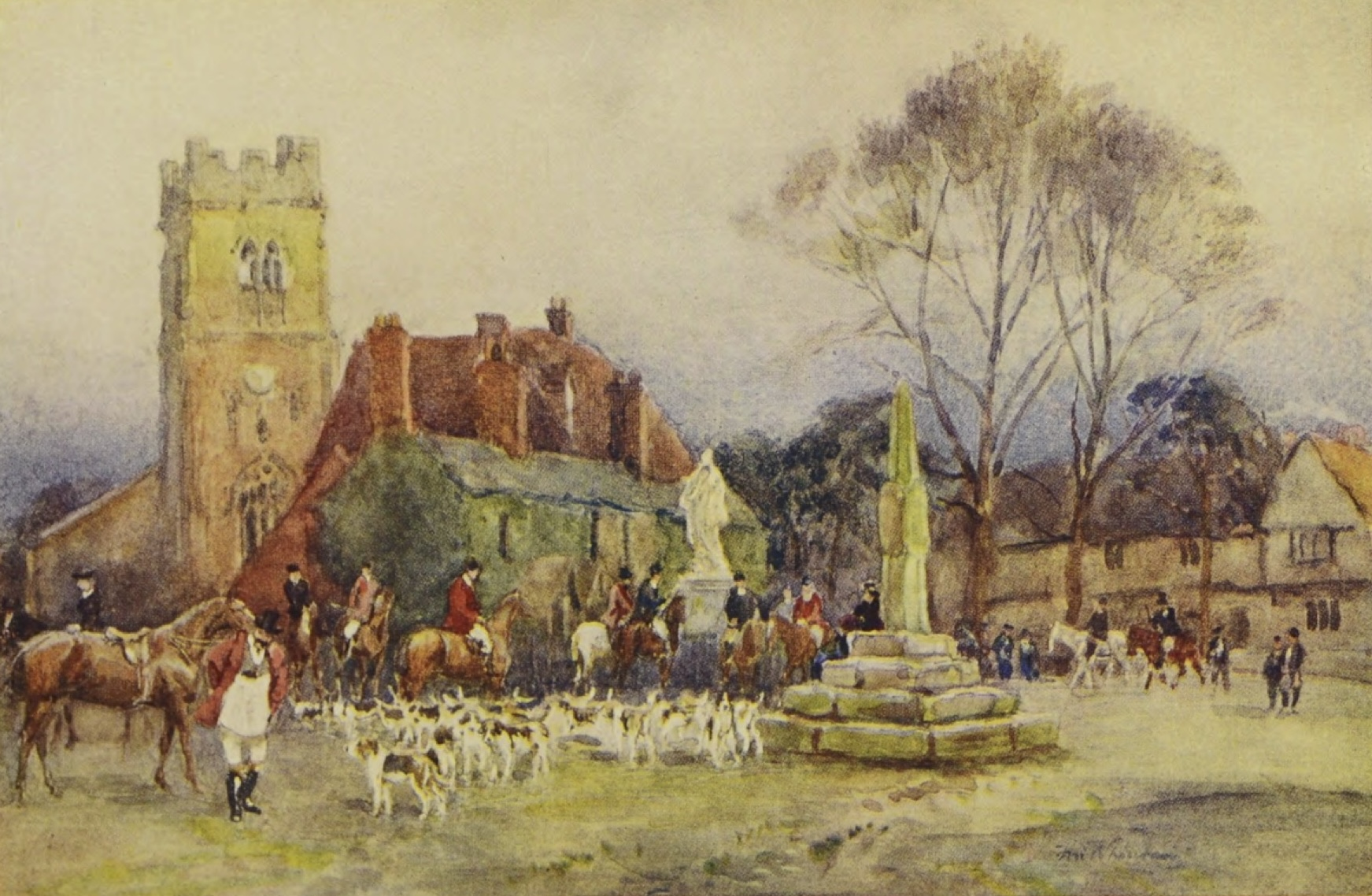
Dunchurch (from "Warwickshire, the land of Shakespeare")

Whitehead seems to be best known for his paintings of the Dorset countryside. He rarely visited Leamington after his marriage, though, between 1881 and 1916, he illustrated three books on Warwickshire, and Leamington Art Gallery and Museum holds eleven paintings and twelve prints of locations in Warwickshire by the artist as well as paintings and prints from locations in France, Wales and Devon.

Whitehead was a member of the Royal Birmingham Society of Artists and exhibited his first painting there in 1870 at the age of eighteen. He also exhibited with the Royal Academy (London) from 1881 to 1893. His work appeared in the exhibitions of leading galleries in Britain and he held a number of successful private exhibitions in London.

He was a great admirer of Constable and has been likened to him in his choice of subject. Although he predominantly painted landscapes, he also concentrated occasionally on religious architecture, such as St Mary’s, Warwick, and Gloucester Cathedral.

Whitehead died in February 1938. He was a true lover of the English countryside who lived alongside nature in order to observe and immortalise it for future generations.

== Bibliography ==
- Holland, Clive. The work of Frederick Whitehead, painter of Thomas Hardy's Wessex (Studio International, Volume 32, 105-9, July, 1904).
- Holland, Clive & Whitehead, Fred (illustrator). Warwickshire, the land of Shakespeare (London: A. C. Black, ltd., 1922 - "Beautiful Britain").
- F. Whitehead (talk by Chloe Johnson at Warwick district council)
