= Liverpool and District cricket team =

The Liverpool and District cricket team played 14 first-class matches between 1882 and 1894, all at their home ground Aigburth.

In 1895, Marylebone Cricket Club (MCC) was asked to give a ruling on the status of an 1895 match versus Cambridge University and declared it not first-class. From that date no matches played by Liverpool and District have been ranked first-class in Wisden or other publications. In 1904, the Liverpool authorities applied to MCC for first-class status for their matches versus first-class teams but, as recorded in the MCC Minutes for May 1904, it was ruled that no Liverpool matches should rank first-class.

== Bibliography ==
- A guide to first-class cricket matches played in the British Isles (second ed.). ACS. 1982.
