= James Whitehead (cricketer, born 1890) =

English cricketer

James Hugh Edendale Whitehead (8 July 1890 – 13 March 1919) was an English first-class cricketer active 1912 who played in a single match for Marylebone Cricket Club (MCC). He played Second XI cricket for Kent. He was the brother of George Whitehead.
