= 1995 Kootenay Lake train derailment =

Railway incident in British Columbia, Canada

Details
- Date: January 20, 1995; 31 years ago
- Location: Kootenay Lake, British Columbia
- Country: British Columbia
- Line: CP's Nelson subdivision
- Operator: Canadian Pacific Railway (CP)
- Incident type: Derailment from a rockslide on the track
- Cause: Rockslide

Statistics
- Trains: 1
- Crew: 3
- Deaths: 2
- Injured: 1

The 1995 Kootenay Lake train derailment was a train derailment that occurred at the Kootenay Lake near Procter, British Columbia on January 20, 1995, on the Canadian Pacific (CP)'s Nelson subdivision.

== Background ==
=== Train consist and crew involved ===
On January 20, 1995, a Canadian Pacific (CP) westward freight train no. 981‑20, was travelling with a three-man crew from Nelson to Castlegar in British Columbia. The train was composed of:

- CP SD40-2 #5738.
- CP SD40-2 #5660.
- CP SD40-2 #5938.
- 49 hopper cars.
  - 27 hopper cars fully loaded with lead sulfide
  - 22 empty hopper cars

The crew involved were 39-year-old engineer Peter Whitehead, 31-year-old trainman Shawn Trevor Hogg, and an unknown conductor. Both Whitehead and Hogg were in the lead locomotive #5738 at the time of the accident.

=== Accident ===
A couple of days prior to the accident, several freeze–thaw cycles had occurred near the Kootenay Lake, which caused some rock on the steep slope above the track to loosen. As a result of the weather, a rockslide was triggered at Mile 111.0 of the CP's Nelson Subdivision, depositing large rocks across the rails. At 7:21 am, on January 20, 1995, as CP train no. 981‑20 approached the 10° curve of Mile 111.0, Whitehead and Hogg spotted the obstruction on the track, and they applied the emergency brakes at a 322-foot (98,000-millimetre; 9,800-centimetre; 98-metre; 3,860-inch) distance from the obstruction. The train collided with the rocks, and all three locomotives tumbled down the 125-foot (38,000-millimetre; 3,800-centimetre; 38-metre; 1,500-inch) embankment into Kootenay Lake, dragging the first two cars of the 49-car freight train into the lake.

The impact spilled lead sulfide from a single fully-loaded hopper car, and caused around 28,000 litres (28,000,000 millilitres; 6,200 imperial gallons; 7,400 US gallons) of diesel fuel to leak into the lake. Both Whitehead and Hogg died in the accident, when they both drowned in the lead locomotive #5738. The conductor, who was in the third locomotive, #5938, suffered minor injuries, broke out of the SD40-2 and ran toward Mile 114 to alert maintenance crews of the derailment.

== Investigation ==
The Transportation Safety Board of Canada (TSB) launched an investigation and found one cause: the rockslide that occurred from multiple freeze–thaw cycles several days prior to the accident. The TSB also found four contributing factors: restricted sightlines (as the train was entering a 10‑degree curve, it had limited the crew's ability to see the obstruction in time); the stopping distance (as the crew applied the emergency brakes 322 feet (98,000 millimetres; 9,800 centimetres; 98 metres; 3,860 inches) from the rockslide due to late reaction time from both Whitehead and Hogg); slope instability; and safety, as there were no slide fences or any warning systems installed to alert crews of rockslides. The TSB published their final report on April 4, 1996.

== Aftermath ==
After the accident, all three SD40-2s involved in the wreck, CP #5738, #5660, and #5938, were pulled out of the lake and written off that same year in 1995. They were sold to Helm Financial (HLCX) for scrap on August 27, 1998.

On the same day, January 20, 1995, after the accident happened, an embankment inspection via helicopter was issued on CP's Nelson subdivision, and the inspection team found approximately twenty more open rock fractures, all twenty of which were warranting close inspection. CP's response included salvage and cleanup, environmental protection, and safety upgrades.

== See also ==
- 1980 Seton Lake train derailment
