= Frank Whitehead (American politician) =

American politician (1892–1976)

C. Frank Whitehead
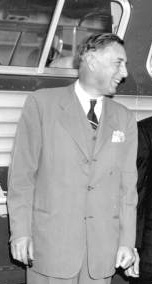

36th Mayor of Jacksonville
- In office 1945–1949
- Preceded by: John T. Alsop, Jr.
- Succeeded by: W. Haydon Burns

Personal details
- Born: July 2, 1892 Athens, Georgia, US
- Died: May 16, 1976 (aged 83) Jacksonville, Florida, US
- Party: Democratic

Caulie Frank Whitehead (July 2, 1892 – May 16, 1976) was an American politician who served as the mayor of Jacksonville, Florida, from 1945 to 1949. He was a member of the Democratic Party.

== History ==
Whitehead ran for Mayor of Jacksonville in 1945. He defeated the incumbent John T. Alsop, Jr., who had been mayor for eighteen years from 1923 to 1937 and from 1941 to 1945, in the Democratic primary; as there was no general election, Whitehead became mayor. Among his initiatives was a plan to ease the city's growing traffic problems by building a new bridge out of pontoons over the St. Johns River. This plan never came to fruition, but influenced the later construction of the conventional Fuller Warren Bridge. Whitehead was defeated in the 1949 mayoral race by the upstart W. Haydon Burns, who successfully courted African-American voters to overcome Whitehead. In Whitehead's later years he owned and ran a room-and-boarding house in Jacksonville. He died in 1976.

Political offices
Preceded by John T. Alsop	Mayor of Jacksonville; 1945–1949	Succeeded by W. Haydon Burns
