= Robert Whitehead =

Robert Whitehead may refer to:

- Robert Whitehead (engineer) (1823–1905), English engineer and entrepreneur who built the first modern torpedo
- Robert Whitehead (Derbyshire) (1856–1938), English land owner and businessman
- Robert Whitehead (theatre producer) (1916–2002), Canadian theatre producer
- Robert G. Whitehead (1916–2007), Texas businessman who created Quaker House Products
- Robert Whitehead (Virginia politician) (1897–1960), Virginia lawyer and Democratic legislator, long chief opponent of the Byrd Organization
- Bob Whitehead (born 1953), game designer and programmer
- Bob Whitehead (soccer), U.S. soccer player
- Bobby Whitehead (1936–2019), English football full back
- Robert E. Whitehead (born 1950), American diplomat
- Bob Whitehead (sprinter), winner of the 1968 distance medley relay at the NCAA Division I Indoor Track and Field Championships
