= List of Old Worthians =

The following is a list of some notable Old Worthians, former pupils of Worth School in the United Kingdom.

== Arts and entertainment ==
- Robert Bathurst – actor
- Harry Enfield – comedian and actor
- Peter Jonas – manager of the English National Opera, director of Bavarian State Opera, and a fellow of the Royal Society of Arts—honours include Fellow of the Royal College of Music, Commander of the Order of the British Empire, Knight Bachelor, Bavarian Order of Merit, Cultural Honor Prize of the City of Munich, Bavarian Maximilian Order for Science and Art.
- Philip Mould – art dealer, art historian, and art adviser to the House of Commons and the House of Lords
- Jim Piddock – actor and author
- Matt Preston – MasterChef Australia judge, journalist for City Limits, and restaurant critic. Preston is the grandson of the 16th Viscount Gormanston and Miss Julia O'Mahony and son of British naval historian and journalist Antony Preston, editor of the periodical Defence.
- Luke Elwes – artist; grandson of the Army officer James Hennessy and the painter Simon Elwes RA ( who was son of Victorian opera singer Gervase Elwes ), a society portrait painter whose patrons included presidents, kings, queens, statesmen, sportsmen, prominent social figures and many members of the British royal family. He was a favourite of Queen Elizabeth The Queen Mother. Luke Elwes is also first cousin of the actor Cary Elwes.

== Broadcasting and journalism ==
- Austen Ivereigh- (born 25 March 1966) is a UK-based Catholic journalist, author, commentator and biographer of Pope Francis.
- James Longman – BBC journalist and foreign correspondent for ABC News
- Christopher Price – journalist, presenter, and original host of Liquid News
- Andrew Murray – born to Peter Drummond-Murray of Mastrick, a stockbroker and banker ( who was Slains Pursuivant ) and The Honourable Barbara Mary Hope ( daughter of former Conservative MP and governor of the Madras Presidency in British India, Lord Rankeillour ) ; was adviser to Jeremy Corbyn ; spent forty years in the Communist Party of Great Britain (CPGB); was chair of the Stop the War Coalition and journalist with the RIA Novosti, Morning Star ( which has been called "Britain's last communist newspaper"), and Tribune
- Charles Rangeley-Wilson, author of three works of non-fiction; writes for The Field, The Times and The Daily Telegraph ; has written and presented for the BBC; was appointed Officer of the Order of the British Empire (OBE) in the 2022 Birthday Honours for services to chalk stream conservation.
- Dominic Waghorn – journalist, diplomatic editor of Sky News, and the Royal Television Society's Television Journalist of the Year, the Foreign Press Association's Journalist of the Year, and One World Media's Journalist of the Year

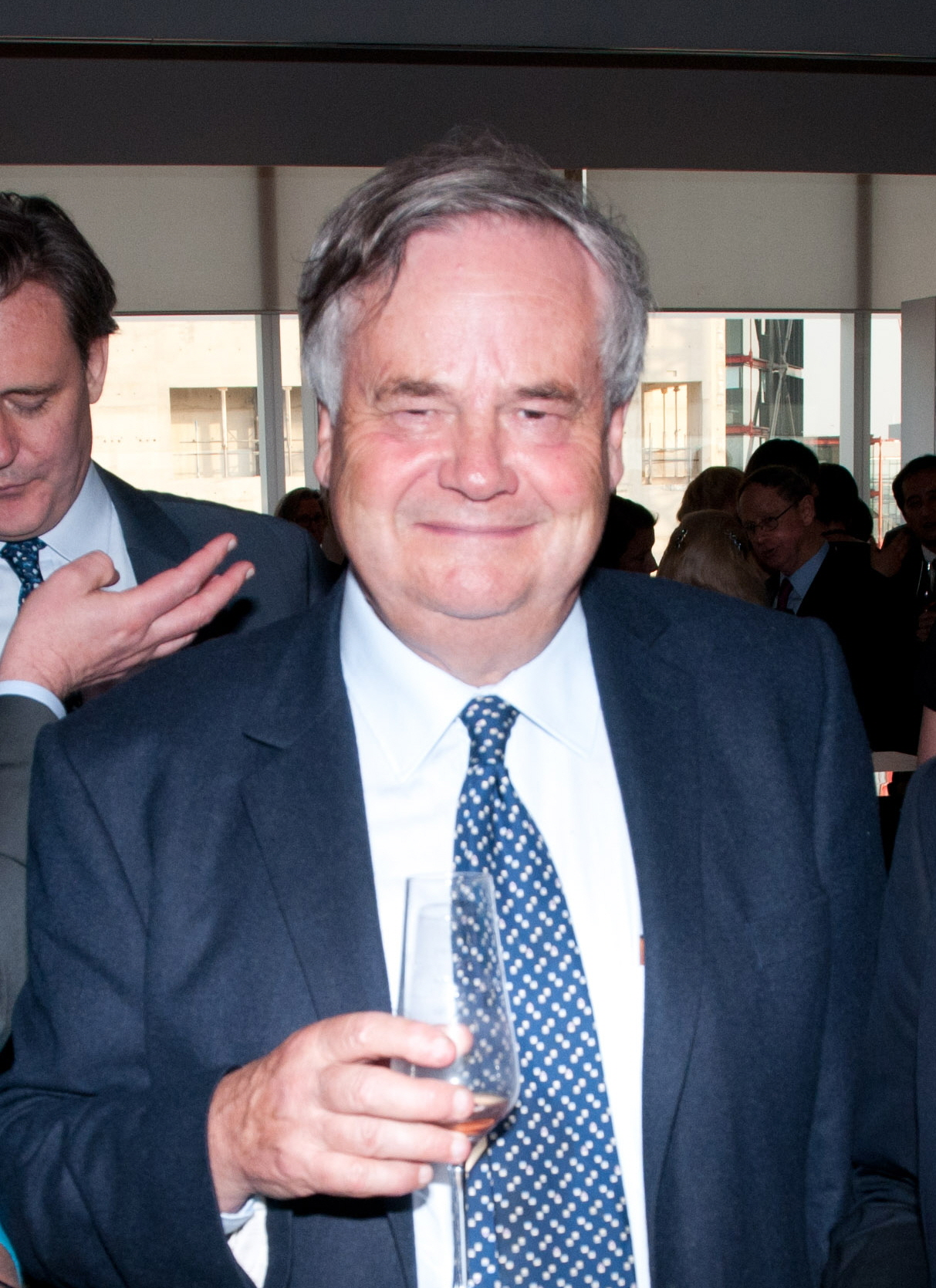
David Bell

== Business ==
- David Bell – director of Pearson Group, chairman of the Financial Times, and chair of the Syndicate of Cambridge University Press
- John Chisholm – chairman of the Medical Research Council and QinetiQ
- Michael Spencer – Spencer was described in 2018 as the richest self-made person in the City of London and a "City grandee". According to the Sunday Times Rich List in 2021, he is worth an estimated £1.2 billion. He was awarded a peerage in August 2020 in the Political Honours List.
- Fernando Zobel de Ayala – director of the Bank of the Philippine Islands, member of the World Economic Forum, and president of Ayala Corporation
- Jaime Augusto Zobel de Ayala – chairman of Ayala Corporation, the Bank of the Philippine Islands, and Globe Telecom

== Academia, Scholarship and Education ==
- Michael Aris – Buddhist historian, husband of Aung San Suu Kyi, and tutor to the Bhutanese royal family; author of The Raven Crown: The Origins of Buddhist Monarchy in Bhutan.
- Michael Questier – academic, historian, postdoctoral fellow at King's College London, and Visiting Fellow at All Souls College, Oxford; author of Elizabeth and the Catholics in Catholics and the Protestant Nation: Religious Politics and Identity in Early Modern England and Catholicism and Community in Early Modern England: Politics, Aristocratic Patronage and Religion, c.1550-1640, Cambridge Studies in Early Modern British History.

== Military ==
- David Hawkins – air vice-marshal, Commandant-General of the RAF Regiment, an officer of the Royal Household, and Deputy Lord-Lieutenant for Greater London. After his RAF service, he became an usher for Black Rod and a Deputy Lord Lieutenant for Greater London.
- Neil Laughton – former officer of the Royal Marines, entrepreneur, and adventurer who has completed the Explorers Grand Slam. He has climbed the highest mountains on all seven continents, reaching both the North and South Poles and holds a number of world firsts and Guinness World Records records for his expeditions on land, sea and air.
- Patrick Sanders – British Army General, Commander of the Order of the British Empire, and Commander of the Joint Forces Command. Sanders carried the Queen's Sceptre in the Royal Procession at the Coronation of Charles III and Camilla.

== Nobility ==
- Dermot de Trafford – 6th Baronet, a fellow of the Royal Society of Arts, and director of Imperial Continental Gas Association
- Anthony Noel – 5th Earl of Gainsborough, president of the British Association, and recipient of the Sovereign Military Order of Malta and Knight of the Venerable Order of St John
- Francis Ormsby-Gore – 6th Baron Harlech and Conservative member of the House of Lords
- Rhodri Philipps – 4th Viscount St Davids, Baron Strange of Knockin, Baron Hungerford, and Baron de Moleyns
- Prince Robert of Luxembourg, Prince of Bourbon-Parma, Prince of Nassau ( b. 1968) is a member of the Grand Ducal Family of Luxembourg. He is a paternal first cousin of Henri, Grand Duke of Luxembourg. Prince Robert is 15th in the line of succession to the Luxembourger throne.
- Prince Dominique de La Rochefoucauld-Montbel; Officer of the Légion d'Honneur and direct descendent of François de La Rochefoucauld, highly influential French moralist of the era of French Classical literature and author of Maximes and Memoirs , whose importance as a social and historical figure is overshadowed by his towering stature in French literature. His most influential literary works are his Maximes, and his letters. Prince Dominique is a member of the ancient French House of La Rochefoucauld, grand hospitaller of the Sovereign Military Order of Malta and as such in charge of all worldwide humanitarian activities of this Catholic organisation.The La Rochefoucauld-Montbel family owned the Lascaux Cave at the time of their discovery and maintain ties to the Pellevoisin sanctuary, a site of Marian apparitions (reported supernatural appearances of the Virgin Mary - recognition by nihil obstat in 2024) in France.

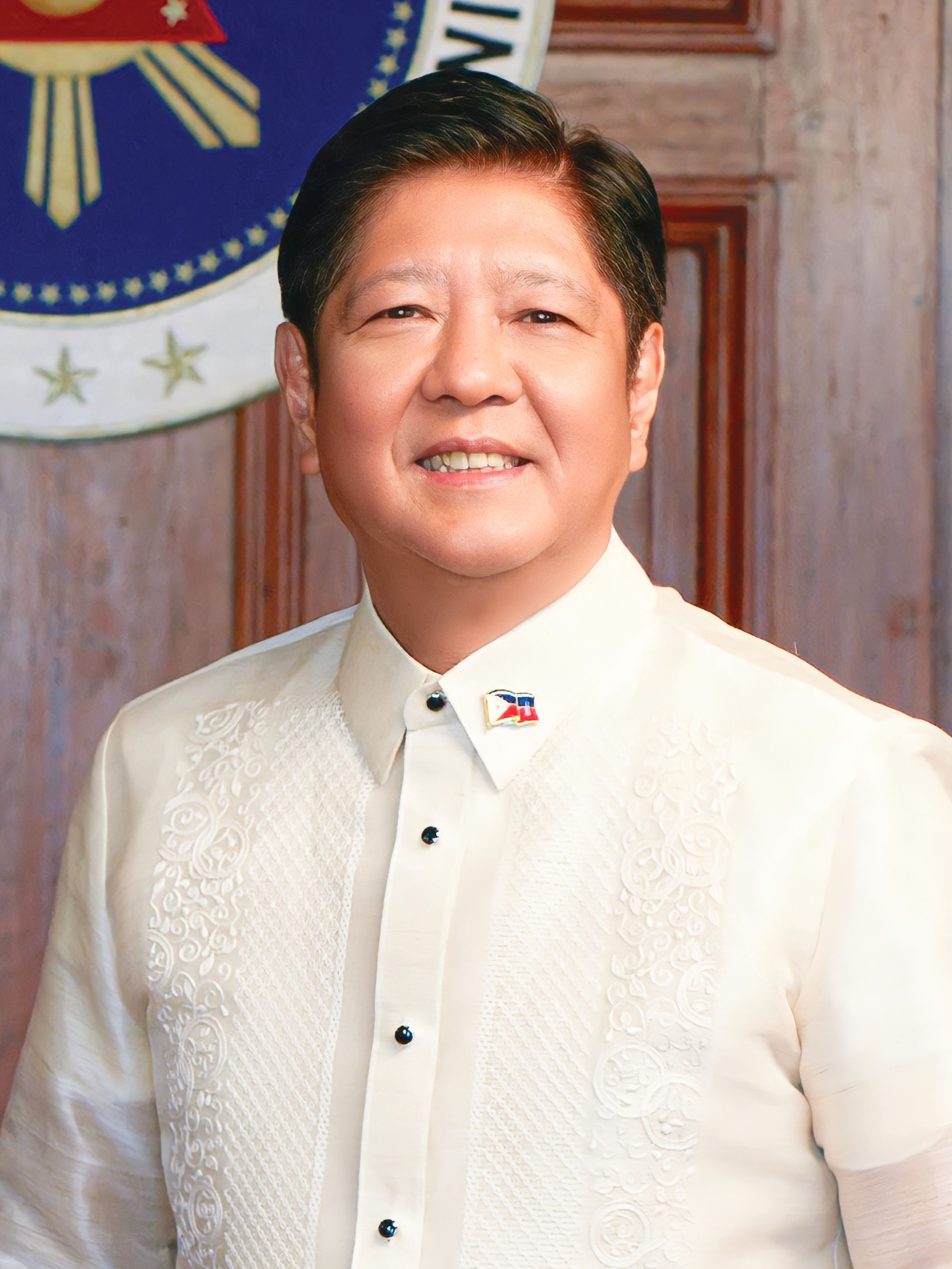
Bongbong Marcos

== Politics ==
- Bongbong Marcos – son of Ferdinand Marcos and Imelda Marcos, Governor of Ilocos Norte, member of the Philippine House of Representatives, senator in the 16th Congress of the Philippines, and 17th President of the Philippines
- Sandro Marcos – House Majority Floor Leader of the Philippine House of Representatives
- Vinny Marcos – Chairman of the Bagong Pilipinas Youth
- Andrew Murray (trade unionist); Labour Party activist; was adviser to Jeremy Corbyn ; senior official for various trade unions; was chair of Stop the War Coalition; was member of Communist Party of Great Britain; contributor to the radical Socialist activist far-left journals, Morning Star and Tribune; worked for the Soviet RIA Novosti news agency; contributor to The Guardian.

== Religion ==
- Austen Ivereigh – founder of Catholic Voices, former deputy editor of The Tablet, and fellow at Campion Hall, Oxford University
- Dom Philip Jebb – Benedictine monk. He was a chaplain to the Sovereign Military Order of Malta and grandson of Hilaire Belloc.
- Michael Questier – academic, scholar, author, and historian focusing on early modern politico-religious history
- John MacWilliam – Bishop of Laghouat in Algeria, the Superior Provincial for North Africa, and a member of the White Fathers

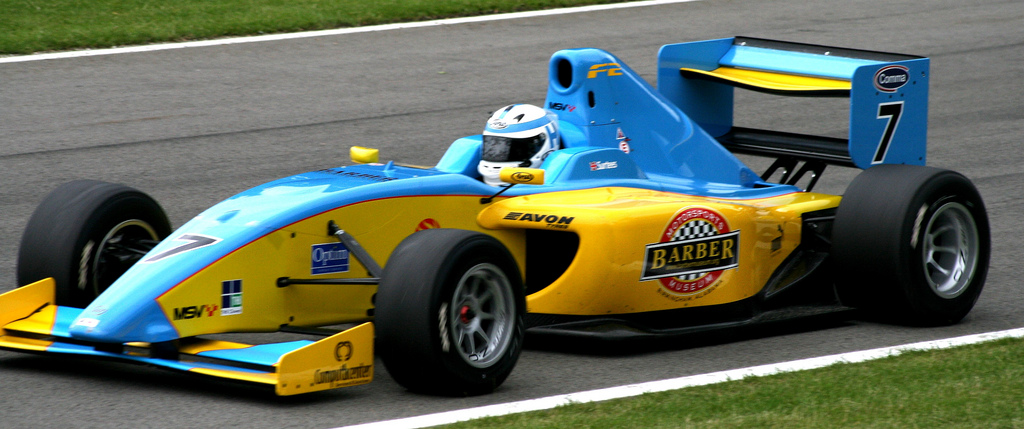
Henry Surtees

== Sports ==
- Onochie Achike – track and field athlete who represented Great Britain in the 2008 Olympics
- Tim Hutchings – medal-winning middle and long-distance runner who represented Great Britain in the 1986 European Athletics Championship, the 1986 Commonwealth Games, and the 1984 Olympic Games
- Nigel Laughton – second lieutenant in the Black Watch; promoted to lieutenant, then promoted to captain; managed the 2011 Cricket World Cup matches ; moved into sports consultancy and management in Olympic sports and was team leader for Team GB at the 2014 Winter Olympics in Sochi.
- Tom Mitchell – England rugby sevens captain who won a silver medal representing Great Britain in the 2016 Summer Olympics
- Henry Surtees – a racing driver in the Formula Renault UK series
- Nick Walshe – rugby union scrum-half for England and the England A national rugby union team

== See also ==
- Category:People educated at Worth School
