= Alexander Courtney =

English historian

Alexander Courtney is an English historian and teacher whose research and published works concern the reign of King James VI and I and the correspondence of his mother, Mary, Queen of Scots.

== Career ==
Alexander Courtney studied history at Selwyn College, Cambridge, and gained a PhD in 2008 with a thesis titled Court politics and the kingship of James VI & I, c. 1615–c. 1622. Courtney has taught history at Tonbridge School, the Haberdashers' Boys' School at Elstree, and The Perse School in Cambridge.

Courtney, Estelle Paranque, and Michael Questier, are preparing a publication, The Secret Correspondence of Mary Queen of Scots, which will explore the correspondence of Mary, Queen of Scots, and include the new texts discovered by the cryptoanalyst George Lasry and his colleagues Norbert Biermann, and Satoshi Tomokiyo.

== Selected publications ==
- (ed. with Michael Questier), James VI and I: Kingship, Government and Religion (Routledge, 2025).
- James VI, Britannic Prince: King of Scots and Elizabeth's Heir, 1566–1603 (Routledge, 2024).
- "The Secret Correspondence of James VI, 1601-3", in Susan Doran and Paulina Kewes, Doubtful and dangerous: The question of the succession in late Elizabethan England (Manchester, 2014).
