= George Lasry =

George Lasry is an Israeli computer scientist and cryptanalyst. He has published several articles and is known for the discovery and deciphering of a group of letters from Mary, Queen of Scots.

== Career ==
George Lasry was a researcher at the Applied Information Security (AIS) research group at the University of Kassel, where he received his doctorate in natural sciences in 2017 under Professor Arno Wacker. The topic of his dissertation was "A Methodology for the Cryptanalysis of Classical Ciphers with Search Metaheuristics". His main interest in cryptographic research lies in the computer-aided cryptanalysis of classical ciphers and cipher machines.

His focus is on the application of local search metaheuristics with the aim of breaking difficult classical encryptions. His cryptanalysis methods have been successfully used to decipher ciphertexts encrypted in a wide variety of ways. Among the encryption methods he has successfully attacked are classical hand keys, such as the Playfair method, double columnar transposition, and the ADFGVX algorithm, as well as machine keys, such as the M-209 and the Enigma machine. He is researching new cryptanalytic attack possibilities against key machines such as the SIGABA, the Hagelin CX-52, the Lorenz key addition SZ 42, and the T52 cipher machine .

Lasry continues to research historical secret codes and codebooks, for example those of the German Imperial Navy from the First World War. In 2023 he gained international attention after he, together with Norbert Biermann and Satoshi Tomokiyo, succeeded in deciphering more than fifty unrecognised and encrypted letters from Mary, Queen of Scots, held by the Bibliothèque nationale de France, which were mostly addressed to the French ambassador in England, Michel de Castelnau. The tool used for this purpose, CrypTool Transcriber & Solver (CTTS), is free software and can be downloaded from the CrypTool website. A publication of the findings, The Secret Correspondence of Mary Queen of Scots authored by the historians Alexander Courtney, Estelle Paranque, and Michael Questier is in preparation.

== Selected publications ==
- with Florentijn van Kampen, "German World War I diplomatic and attaché codes: a revised study and the Dutch contribution", Crypotologia (May 2026). doi:10.1080/01611194.2026.2638191
- with Norbert Biermann and Satoshi Tomokiyo, "What Encryption Errors Can Reveal: Cross-Cipher Errors in Mary Queen of Scots' Letters", Proceedings of the 7th International Conference on Historical Cryptology (2024), doi:10.58009/aere-perennius0087
- with Norbert Biermann and Satoshi Tomokiyo, "Deciphering Mary Stuart's lost letters from 1578–1584", Cryptologia, 47:2 (February 2023). doi:10.1080/01611194.2022.2160677
- "Analysis of a late 19th century French cipher created by Major Josse", Cryptologia, 47:1 (2023). doi:10.1080/01611194.2021.1996484
- with Richard Bean and Frode Weierud, "We decrypted messages from the Biafran war that have remained secret for 50 years", The Conversation, 13 July 2020
- with Nils Kopal and Arno Wacker, "Cryptanalysis of Enigma double indicators with hill climbing", Cryptologia, 43:4 (2019). doi:10.1080/01611194.2018.1551253
- with Nils Kopal and Arno Wacker, "Solving the Double Transposition Challenge with a Divide-and-Conquer Approach", Cryptologia, 38:3 (2014). doi:10.1080/01611194.2014.915269
- A Methodology for the Cryptanalysis of Classical Ciphers with Search Metaheuristics (University of Kassel, 2018).
