= Brian Cathcart =

Irish-born journalist, academic and media campaigner

Brian Cathcart (born 26 October 1956) is an Irish-born journalist, academic and media campaigner based in the United Kingdom. He is a founder of Hacked Off, which campaigns for a free and accountable press. His books include Were You Still Up for Portillo? (1997), The Case of Stephen Lawrence (1999), The Fly in the Cathedral (2004) and The News From Waterloo (2015).

== Background and journalism ==
Born in Ireland, Cathcart attended school in Dublin and Belfast before taking a degree in history at Trinity College Dublin. After graduating in 1978, he joined Reuters news agency, first as a trainee and then as a correspondent. He was on the founding staff of The Independent in 1986, and of The Independent on Sunday in 1990, rising to become deputy editor of the latter paper.

From 1997, Cathcart was a freelance journalist and author, writing about the murder of Stephen Lawrence, the scandal of trainee deaths at the British army’s Deepcut Barracks and the false conviction of Barry George for the murder of Jill Dando. In 2005–8, he was assistant editor and then media columnist at the New Statesman. From 2002, he helped launch journalism teaching at Kingston University, finally becoming professor there in 2006.

== Hacked Off and press standards ==
From 2008 to 2010, Cathcart was specialist adviser to the House of Commons Select Committee on Culture, Media and Sport at a time when it was investigating press standards and the phone-hacking scandal. The Committee report was highly critical of News International (now News UK) and of the Press Complaints Commission (since abolished). From 2010, Cathcart blogged on the unfolding hacking affair, mostly for Index on Censorship, and in 2011, with Martin Moore, director of the Media Standards Trust, he launched Hacked Off to press for a public inquiry into hacking and press standards. Cathcart served as Hacked Off’s first executive director from 2012 to 2014, writing extensively on press self-regulation and acting as the campaign's principal spokesman. He appeared before The Leveson Inquiry twice, and his stance on press standards has drawn criticism and personal attacks from some in the industry.

== History writing ==
Cathcart has written on history, both as a journalist and an author. At The Independent on Sunday he wrote a weekly column on the subject called "Rear Window", and began publishing on the history of science. Test of Greatness (1994) was an account of the making of the British atomic bomb. Rain (2002) was about the science of rain. The Fly in the Cathedral (2004) was about the first successful artificial disintegration of the atomic nucleus (the splitting of the atom) at Cambridge in the 1930s. Cathcart later wrote about the early history of journalism and communication, which is the subject of The News From Waterloo: The Race to Tell Britain of Wellington's Victory published in May 2015.

== Bibliography ==
- Test of Greatness: Britain’s Struggle for the Atom Bomb (1994) ISBN 9780719552250
- Were You Still Up for Portillo? (1997) ISBN 9780140272376
- The Case of Stephen Lawrence (1999, winner of the Orwell Prize for political writing and the Crime Writers’ Association Gold Dagger for Non-Fiction) ISBN 9780140279054
- Jill Dando: Her Life and Death (2001) ISBN 9780140294682
- Rain (2002) ISBN 9781862075344
- The Fly in the Cathedral: How a small group of Cambridge scientists won the race to split the atom (2004) ISBN 9780670883219
- Everybody’s Hacked Off: Why we don’t have the press we deserve and what to do about it (with Hugh Grant, 2012) ISBN 9780241965566
- The News from Waterloo: The race to tell Britain of Wellington’s victory (2015) ISBN 9780571315253

== Academic Accolades ==
- Crime Writers' Association Non-Fiction Gold Dagger 1999
- Orwell Prize for political writing 2000
