= Austen Ivereigh =

British journalist and author

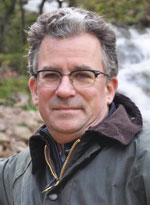
Austen Ivereigh, author and commentator

Austen Ivereigh (born 25 March 1966) is a UK-based Catholic journalist, author, commentator and biographer of Pope Francis.Ivereigh attended Worth School, a Benedictine Catholic boarding school near Worth, West Sussex, England. The school is located within Worth Abbey, a Benedictine monastery.

== Career ==
Ivereigh formerly served as deputy editor of The Tablet and later director for public affairs of the former Archbishop of Westminster, Cardinal Cormac Murphy-O'Connor. Ivereigh travelled with the archbishop to Rome for the 2005 papal conclave.

In 2014, Ivereigh published The Great Reformer: Francis and the Making of a Radical Pope, a biography of Pope Francis. Hugh O'Shaughnessy wrote in The Observer, "Dr Ivereigh’s exhaustive book on the first pope from the New World follows Paul Vallely’s excellent Pope Francis: Untying the Knots, in making better known the life and thoughts of this son of Italian immigrants to Buenos Aires." In The Washington Post, Elizabeth Tenety wrote, "In pushing the church forward, Francis today insists that 'God is not afraid of new things' and that the complexities of human life are not necessarily black and white. 'Jorge Bergoglio’s radicalism comes from his willingness to go to the essentials, to pare back to the Gospel,' Ivereigh writes. Francis found his way to the essentials while putting in place the post-Vatican II spiritual renewal in his Jesuit order by focusing on 'poverty, holiness, missionary focus, obedience to the pope and unity.' During his time as provincial superior of the Society of Jesus in Argentina, he attempted to reorient a politically charged church culture toward the spirituality of everyday holiness."

Ivereigh followed up with a second biography in 2019, Wounded Shepherd: Pope Francis and His Struggle to Convert the Catholic Church.

Ivereigh frequently appears on radio and TV programmes to comment in stories involving the Church. He is Fellow in Contemporary Church History at Campion Hall, Oxford.

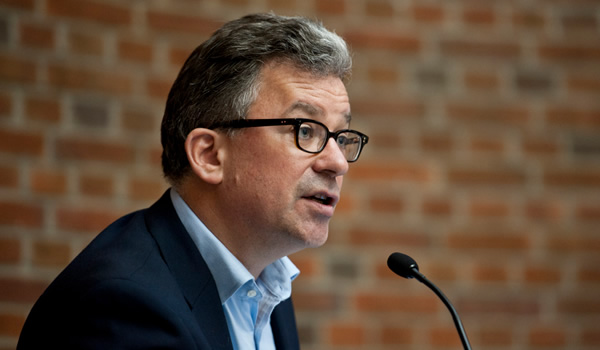
Ivereigh speaking at an interview for an Argentinian newspaper.

== Press allegations and resignation ==
On 18 July 2006, Ivereigh resigned as the cardinal's director of public affairs following allegations by the Daily Mail that he had steered multiple women toward abortions. The allegations were the subject of legal proceedings initiated by Ivereigh in the High Court of Justice against Associated Newspapers Ltd. A trial in February 2008 was inconclusive, but at the retrial in January 2009 the jury unanimously found that Ivereigh had been libelled. He was awarded £30,000 in damages, and all costs, estimated at £3 million. Ivereigh said his reputation had been "comprehensively vindicated".

== Catholic Voices ==
Together with Jack Valero, Austen Ivereigh headed a media group, Catholic Voices, set up to respond to opposition to the visit of the Pope to the UK in 2010. The organization trains people to put the Catholic Church's case in the media.

== Bibliography ==
=== Authored Books ===
- Catholicism and Politics in Argentina, 1810-1960 (New York: St Martin's Press; Basingstoke: Macmillan in association with St Antony's College, Oxford, 1995)
- Faithful Citizens: A Practical Guide to Catholic Social Teaching and Community Organising (Wandsworth: Darton Longman & Todd, 2010)
- How to Defend the Faith Without Raising Your Voice: Civil Responses to Catholic Hot-Button Issues (Huntington: Our Sunday Voice, 2012)
- The Great Reformer: Francis and the Making of a Radical Pope (New York: Henry Holt, 2014)
- Wounded Shepherd: Pope Francis and His Struggle to Convert the Catholic Church (New York: Henry Holt, 2019)
- ’’First Belong to God: On Retreat with Pope Francis’’ (Chicago: Loyola Press, 2024)

=== Edited books ===
- The Politics of Religion in an Age of Revival: Studies in Nineteenth-Century Europe and Latin America (London: Institute of Latin American Studies, 2000)
- Unfinished Journey: the Church 40 Years after Vatican II: Essays for John Wilkins (New York; London: Continuum, 2003)
