= Julia Middleton =

British businesswoman

Julia Mary Middleton (née Morland; 21 April 1958) is the founder of Women Emerging in the UK. She is also the founder and former chief executive officer of Common Purpose, an international charity that runs leadership development programmes.

She is a campaigner for the progression of diverse leaders in civil society.

== Early life and education ==
Born in Lambeth, London, Middleton is the daughter of Agnes (née Whowell) and Eric Morland. Middleton was educated at the lycée Français in France and New York before earning an Economics degree from the London School of Economics.

== Career ==
In 1980, Middleton began her career at the Industrial Society, where she created Head Start, a programme providing high school dropouts with training and advice from prospective employers.

In the autumn of 1988, Middleton formed Common Purpose, an organization that hosts leadership development courses. The group runs local leadership courses in cities across the world, as well as global programmes for leaders from over 100 countries across six continents.

In 2020, Middleton formed another organisation, Women Emerging, and in 2022, she launched the Women Emerging Expedition, to find an approach to leadership that resonates with women. She also launched a podcast which documents the experiences of the women taking part in the programme.

Middleton is a member of the board of trustees for Alfanar, a venture philanthropy fund, the International Advisory Council for Fundação Dom Cabral, and is a Goodwill Ambassador of the Aurora Forum.

She was also involved in the founding of the Media Standards Trust, a charity that runs Journalisted, a free online journalist portfolio, DEMOS, a UK-based think tank, and Impetus Trust, which develops venture philanthropy in the UK.

In 2019, Middleton handed over the role of CEO of Common Purpose, although she is still involved in the organisation.

In 2020, she founded a social initiative called ‘’Women Emerging from Isolation’’.

== Literature ==
In 1982, Middleton wrote a book called Quality Circles, published by the Industrial Society in London.

She also wrote the foreword to the book How to be an even better chair: Sensible Advice from the Public & Charity Sectors, written by Sophie Petit-Zeman.

In February 2007, Middleton's book Beyond Authority: Leadership in a Changing World was published by Palgrave Macmillan, and she recorded a meet-the-author video.

In 2010, it was translated into Hungarian and published by HVG Konyvek.

In 2014, Middleton wrote "Cultural Intelligence: CQ: The Competitive Edge for Leaders Crossing Borders" published by Bloomsbury and she recorded a video about why she wrote it. In late 2014, a paperback version was published for the Indian market.

== Personal life ==
Julia Middleton married Rupert Middleton in 1984; they have two sons and three daughters.

== See also ==
Cultural Intelligence
