= Common Purpose =

British charity

Common Purpose UK
- Founded: 1989
- Founder: Julia Middleton
- Type: Charity and company limited by guarantee
- Purpose: Education
- Location: London, England
- Region served: International
- CEO: Adirupa Sengupta
- Employees: 125

Common Purpose is a British-founded charity that runs leadership-development programmes around the world.

Common Purpose UK is a subsidiary of Common Purpose.

Founded in 1989 by Julia Middleton, its aim is to develop leaders who cross boundaries so they can solve complex problems in work and in society. Adirupa Sengupta was appointed as Group CEO in 2019.

As of 2015 Common Purpose ran local programmes for leaders in cities across the world, and its global programmes bring together leaders from over 100 countries across six continents. As of 2019, 85,000 leaders worldwide have taken part in Common Purpose programmes.

== Activities ==
=== Courses ===
Common Purpose works with a wide range of organisations and individuals across the business, public and NGO sectors. As of 2019, 85,000 leaders have taken part in Common Purpose programmes.

=== International Certificate in Education ===
In May 2024, Times Higher Education (THE), NAFSA and Common Purpose collaborated to launch a new International Education Professional Certificate (IPEC) IEPC is offered online, and designed to provide “knowledge, skills and competencies for success in global education”. The 12 week certificate course is backed by three brands who serve the global higher education sector (NAFSA, Common Purpose and THE.)

=== Education and young people ===
Common Purpose works with universities to run programmes for students to develop global leadership skills. As of 2019, 8,000 students completed Common Purpose programmes each year. They also run free leadership programmes for 18-25 year olds in the US, Singapore, Pakistan, Bangladesh, Nigeria, Germany and the UK as part of their Legacy campaign.

In 2021, Common Purpose partnered with Times Higher Education to launch an online course designed for students to increase their employability skills.

=== Senior executives ===
What Next? was a 2010 course run by leadership development organisation Common Purpose and the Said Business School to help redundant executives identify opportunities to continue to use the experience they have accumulated during their careers.

Between 2013 and 2019, Common Purpose partnered with the Commonwealth Study Conference to run CSCLeaders, an annual global leadership programme for 100 exceptional senior leaders selected from governments, businesses and NGOs across the 54 countries of the Commonwealth.

=== Leadership campaigns ===
In July 2009 Common Purpose was commissioned by the Government Equalities Office to conduct an online survey of individuals in leadership positions, and produce a report entitled "Diversity of Representation in Public Appointments". Subsequently, Common Purpose and the Government Equalities Office set up The About Time Public Leaders Courses, designed to support the government's aim to increase the diversity of public-body board members and the pool of talented individuals ready to take up public appointments. The schemes were formally launched in January 2010. In January 2010, Common Purpose Chief Executive, Julia Middleton, published interviews with 12 leaders from the private, public and voluntary sectors, including Sir David Bell and Dame Suzi Leather about the qualities needed for good leadership in challenging times.

=== Projects ===
In July 2008 Common Purpose introduced a project in Bangalore, India, which took 50 people from different sectors, e.g. IT and banking, and encouraged them to share local and international knowledge in order to solve problems associated with trading in a recession. It has also run projects in Germany, to highlight the importance of having good facilities for the disabled.

== Press coverage ==
In May 2008 the Yorkshire Post revealed that Common Purpose had been granted free office space at the Department for Children, Schools and Families in Sheffield in 1997. A DCSF spokeswoman said the free office accommodation had been given in line with the policy of the then Education Secretary David Blunkett, a Sheffield MP, who had wanted to build better links with the local community. But Philip Davies, Conservative MP for Shipley, criticised the relationship between Government and Common Purpose as well as the fact it did not put the content of its training in the public domain.

In January 2009 Third Sector magazine reported that Common Purpose was to face no further action from the Information Commissioner's Office. The announcement came following the ICO's ruling in October 2008 that the charity was unlikely to have complied with the provisions in the Data Protection Act on processing personal data when it compiled a list containing the personal details of people who had made what it (CP) contended were "vexatious" requests under the Freedom of Information Act 2000 relating to its dealings with public authorities.

In March 2009, BBC Radio 5 broadcast a story (with a written counterpart being published on the BBC News website) on Common Purpose following persistent criticism that the organisation was akin to a secret society and that its leadership courses had a left-wing and pro-European bias. At the time, Common Purpose did not deny trying to identify future leaders "but they say their agenda is merely to open up the potential for success to a more diverse range of people [...] "We are always balanced and owe no historical or other allegiance to any other group."" People attending Common Purpose courses also denied the presence of any ideological bias. While the organisation's meetings were held under the Chatham House Rule, meaning that statements made during the meetings were unattributable, trustee Andrew Cubie said that comparable organisations operated similarly and that the Rule simply meant attendees were "very frank. They talk about their failures more than their successes. You get a very good learning process." However, the story did note concern about taxpayer-funded institutions like government departments (such as the Department for Work and Pensions), police forces, and local authorities (as well as the licence fee-funded BBC) "pay[ing] money to a charity to host training courses which are essentially networking opportunities for staff"; some of the courses cost as much as £5,750 at the time of broadcast, while the DWP was on record as having spent £238,000 on Common Purpose courses between 2002 and 2007. It was also noted that graduate professionals formed the bulk of course attendees and that, while the courses were ostensibly open to all, only those who were assessed as having leadership potential had a realistic chance of being accepted. The story concluded that, while the more conspiratorial accusations against Common Purpose were baseless, the organisation's stated aim of identifying and training leaders meant that "the charges of elitism seem difficult to refute".

== Leveson Inquiry controversy ==
A number of UK national newspapers ran stories implying that Common Purpose had exerted improper influence over the Leveson Inquiry, in the days preceding publication of its report. These stories centred on the role of Inquiry member Sir David Bell, who was both a trustee of Common Purpose, and had set up the Media Standards Trust (a lobbying group which presented evidence to the Inquiry) together with Julia Middleton. Moreover, the Media Standards Trust set up and provided funding for the lobbying group Hacked Off, which also presented evidence to the Inquiry. Bell resigned from the Media Standards Trust when he was appointed a member of the Inquiry. On 25 November, The Daily Telegraph too published a comment piece on CPUK, noting that the Rotherham Director of Children's Services, Joyce Thacker, heavily criticised in the Rotherham child sexual exploitation scandal, was a member of CPUK, and noting that Common Purpose had been described as "[a] secretive Fabian organisation [... that] has been described as a Left-wing version of the Freemasons."

Writing in The Guardian, Roy Greenslade described the Mail coverage of Common Purpose in general, and the central focus on Sir David Bell in particular, as "a classic example of conspiracist innuendo" and went on that "through a series of leaps of logic and phoney 'revelations' of Bell's publicly acknowledged positions, the articles persistently insinuate that he has been up to no good." This opinion was shared in an article in the New Statesman by Peter Wilby. Also in The Guardian, Michael White acknowledged that, "anti-establishment bodies should be as much fair game for accountability as those of the old establishment", but said: "I couldn't help thinking as I read it that the analysis itself is a bit of a conspiracy. Delete 'Common Purpose' throughout and insert 'Jew', 'Etonian' or 'Freemason' and you'd rightly feel uneasy."
