= David Bell (publisher) =

English businessman

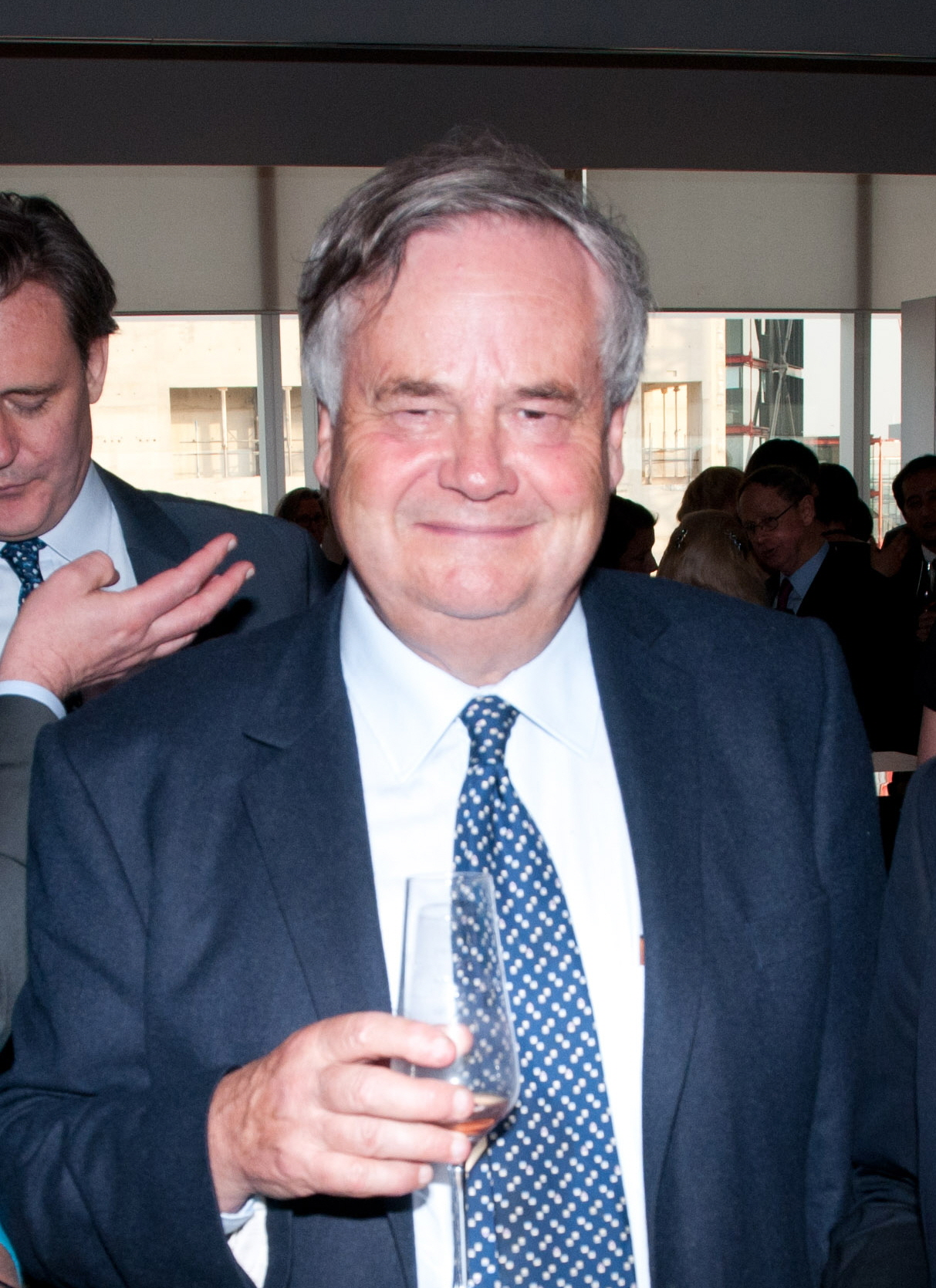
Bell at the Financial Times 125th Anniversary Party in London in 2013

Sir David Charles Maurice Bell (born 30 September 1946) is a businessman, publisher and philanthropist.

He was chief executive (1993–1996) and chairman (1996–2009) of the Financial Times, and chairman of Pearson plc (2003–2009). He also chaired the Crisis charity (2002–2012) and the Media Standards Trust (2005–2011, 2012–2022), and participated in the Leveson Inquiry (2011–2012). In 2012 he became chair of the governing syndicate of Cambridge University Press.

== Background and personal life ==
Born in Henfield, Sir David was educated at Worth School. He is an alumnus of the University of Pennsylvania and Cambridge University.

He is married to Primrose, with three children.

== Career ==
Having worked at the Oxford Mail (1970–1972), Bell became a news editor at the Financial Times in 1978. He rose to Managing Editor (1985–1989) before moving to the business side, initially as marketing director (1989–1993). He became Chief Executive in 1993 and chairman in 1996, before retiring in 2009. He was also appointed Director for People at Pearson Group in 1998 and Chairman of Pearson in 2003.

As Chairman of the UK's Millennium Bridge Trust (1995 to 2002) David Bell signed off London's Millennium Bridge, which he could see from his office window at the FT.

He then chaired Crisis UK for 10 years until 2012.

In 2005, he co-founded and then chaired the Media Standards Trust (as late as 2022, with a temporary suspension/resignation for his involvement in the Leveson Inquiry), which helped administer the Orwell Prize.

He was an assessor on the Leveson Inquiry from 2011 to 2012.

In November 2012 he became chair of the syndicate of Cambridge University Press.

== Other positions ==
He is a director of ImagineNations, where he is also Secretary and Treasurer.

He is a governor at Worth School, a Catholic independent school in Sussex.

Sir David is Chair of Council at Roehampton University.

Sir David is International Chair of the Institute for War & Peace Reporting, iwpr.net.

Sir David is also Chairman of Sadler's Wells.

Sir David is a trustee of Common Purpose UK.

Sir David Bell has been appointed as the non-executive chair of the steering committee driving the development of the National Equality Standard.

He is also on the Royal National Theatre Honorary Council.

== Honours ==
Sir David was made a Knight Bachelor for services to industry, the arts and charity in the Queen's 2004 Birthday Honours.

In 2007, Sir David was awarded an honorary degree from City University London.
