= Catholic Comment =

Linked with the international group Catholic Voices, Catholic Comment is a national socially conservative advocacy group based in Ireland. Its membership is limited to people who are "enthusiastic about their faith." It aims to "try to throw light on the mission and message of the Catholic Church" and "complement the work carried out by bishops and others." Launched for Dublin's International Eucharistic Congress in June 2012, it immediately began work promoting Catholic doctrine in media interviews, appearing on dozens of programmes in its first year. It is at the forefront of arguing for the preservation of a Catholic ethos in schools and opposes any move towards same-sex marriage. It receives many requests from the Dublin media. Petra Conroy coordinates the group and says, “We would never refuse any show as long as we have someone available.”
