= National Equality Standard =

- Founded: 22 May 2013
- Headquarters: London, England
- Area served: UK
- Key people: Arun Batra (CEO & founder)
- Website: www.ey.com

The National Equality Standard (NES) is an initiative created by Ernst & Young in 2013. It was developed "for business, by business" and sets clear Equality, Diversity and Inclusion (EDI) criteria against which companies are assessed. Their EDI policies and practices are reviewed, areas for improvement are identified, and recommendations for improvement are provided.

== Background ==
The NES has been developed and sponsored by Ernst & Young, supported by the Equality & Human Rights Commission (EHRC), the Home Office and the Confederation of British Industry and developed in partnership with the following UK and global companies:

- BHP
- Bright Ideas Trust
- BT Group
- Cisco
- EDF Energy
- Green Park
- Lawn Tennis Association
- Linklaters
- Microsoft UK
- National Grid
- Nestlé
- Pearn Kandola
- Pearson
- Roast
- Royal Bank of Scotland
- Vodafone
- WPP

The NES was launched in May 2013 at the British Museum. Since then many businesses have signed up and the Standard has received significant media attention and news coverage.

== People ==
Arun Batra is the CEO and founder of the NES. Prior to his position at Ernst & Young, he ran the Mayor's "Diversity Works" programme in London. He has recently been recognised as one of Britain's most influential Asians for leading the establishment of the NES.

Batra is supported by Harry Gaskell, the managing partner of Ernst & Young's UK and Ireland advisory Practice and Head of D&I, and the Chair of the Employers Network for Equality & Inclusion (ENEI).Sir David Bell has been appointed as the Non-executive Chair of the steering committee that drives the development of the NES.

== The National Equality Standard Assessment ==
Through the NES, companies are subjected to an EDI assessment which has been devised by the NES Board and EY. The NES Assessment provides companies with a comprehensive quality review of their EDI policies and practices, identifies areas for improvement and provides implementation recommendations. Each company that undertakes the NES undergoes assessment against a predefined set of criteria across seven standards. Trained NES Assessors review documentation, ensure legal compliance, conduct comprehensive interviews and sample staff through in-depth surveys. The outcome is detailed in a comprehensive report.

== Feedback ==
The feedback from those undertaking assessments has been positive; Tina Southall, Director, Diversity and Inclusion at Vodafone Group Services described the assessment process in an interview:

“The assessment process was excellent. It really captured both the macro status but also important details. It consisted of an in-depth review of materials and a very professional and well structured audit. It provided thought provoking insights combined with pragmatic and actionable recommendations. The Standard has potential to drive a real change in Equality Standards.”
