= Dominic Waghorn =

British journalist

- Born: Dominic David Waghorn; December 1968 (age 57); Lambeth, London
- Education: Streete Court School, Surrey; Worth School, West Sussex
- Alma mater: University of Bristol; University of the West of England
- Occupations: Journalist and TV presenter
- Employer: Sky News
- Notable work: World View
- Title: International Affairs Editor of Sky News (2015–present)
- Spouse(s): Penny (actress and jewellery designer)
- Children: Three; Two boys and one girl

Dominic David Waghorn (born 1968, Lambeth), is a British journalist who is the International Affairs Editor of Sky News and formerly presenter of the channel's weekly international affairs analysis programme World View. He was before that US Correspondent of Sky News, the 24-hour television news service operated by Sky Television, part of British Sky Broadcasting. He was formerly Sky News' Asia Correspondent, based in Beijing and Middle East Correspondent, based in Jerusalem. He became Sky News' US Correspondent in 2011.

== Education ==
Waghorn was educated at Streete Court School, a former preparatory (junior) independent school for boys, in the village of Godstone in Surrey in South East England, from 1976 to 1982, and at Worth School, a Roman Catholic senior boarding independent school for boys (now co-educational), near the village of Turners Hill (which is almost equidistant from the towns of East Grinstead and Crawley) in West Sussex, from 1982 to 1987, of which he says he has "very fond memories", and boarded at St. Bede's House. He then went to the University of Bristol (1988–1991), where he gained a BA in history, followed by the University of the West of England, where he gained a Diploma in Broadcast Journalism.

== Life and career ==
Waghorn started at LBC Radio in London, where he was an editor, producer and news reporter. He joined the Feature Story News (FSN) news agency in 1996, and was its North America Correspondent, based in Washington, D.C.. He later set up the agency's London Bureau, where he was Bureau Chief and television and radio correspondent. It was during this time that he covered the visit of Nelson Mandela in May 1999, when NATO bombed the Chinese Embassy in Belgrade, working on outdated intelligence information which had indicated its previous suspected usage as a munitions storage site for forces loyal to Slobodan Milosevic. For FSN, Waghorn covered the subsequent large demonstrations across Beijing, in which western embassies, including those of some not involved in the conflict, came under siege. His FSN reports were carried by networks in three continents, among which was his first report to be shown on Sky News.

Waghorn joined Sky News in January 2001. He became Sky News' Asia Correspondent in January 2004, and remained there for just under three years, where his exclusive reports won several awards, including RTS Television Journalist of the Year and News Item of the Year in 2007, for a series of investigative reports in China. He also won awards for his China and South East Asia reporting, as Foreign Press Association Journalist of the Year award and One World Media Journalist of the Year and a Golden Nymph for Best TV News Item at the Monte Carlo TV Festival.

In late 2006, Waghorn became Sky News' Middle East Correspondent, based in Jerusalem. He worked there for almost five years, during which time he covered the wars in Iraq, the aftermath of the war in Lebanon and the Arab Spring. Whilst in the Middle East, he reflected on his school experiences: of Streete Court School in the village of Godstone in Surrey, he says that the Middle East's "biblical surroundings remind him on an almost daily basis of Major James' nightly Oak Room bible readings and the weekly scriptural writing sessions administered by Ellis Parry. The other day he was driving up through the Sinai and Major James' explanation of Moses finding water while leading the Israelites out of Egypt, came to mind", and that at Worth School, near the village of Turners Hill (near Crawley) in West Sussex, he says he had studied the Crusades "through the barrage of Father Stephen's pipe smoke".

In 2009, Waghorn was the first British journalist to re-enter Gaza after Hamas' takeover in 2007, and was praised in the press for his coverage of the 2009 Gaza Conflict. In 2010, he was despatched to the Caribbean to report on the Haiti earthquake. In 2011, he was among the first Western journalists to enter Libya, days after the defeat of Gaddafi forces in the east, reporting exclusively from Benghazi and the road to Ras Lanuf.

Waghorn was part of the Sky News BAFTA winning team reporting 'Inside Idlib' in 2021

Waghorn was part of Sky's BAFTA-nominated and Golden-Nymph award winning team covering the Egyptian revolution before the downfall of President Hosni Mubarak, from the outbreak of protests, to the 'Friday of Rage' protests in Cairo's Tahrir Square, demanding Mubarak's rapid departure (rather than the long transition period envisaged by the Egyptian Government), and Mubarak's subsequent downfall and the immediate aftermath.

Waghorn became Sky News' US Correspondent, based in its Washington, D.C. bureau, in 2011. He has travelled extensively across the United States, covering the US presidential primary campaigns and the re-election of Barack Obama.

During the 2023 Israel-Hamas war hostage crisis, Waghorn was condemned by the Board of Deputies of British Jews claimed that released Israeli hostages were "held in reasonable conditions, reportedly, though those held above ground lived with the fear of being killed in Israel’s bombardment." The aunt of a 12-year boy released from captivity described details of threats and psychological abuse from Hamas, including forcing him to watch videos of the 2023 Hamas attack on Israel.

== Awards ==
Waghorn was awarded the RTS Television Journalist of the Year and News Item of the Year in 2007, for a series of investigative reports in China. He also won Journalist of the Year Award from the Foreign Press Association, the One World Media Journalist of the Year Award, and a Golden Nymph for Best TV News Item in the Monte Carlo TV Festival for a story on AIDS in China. He and other colleagues at Sky were nominated for a BAFTA for coverage of the Egyptian Revolution of 2011.

== Family ==
Waghorn is married to Penny, who is an actress and jewellery designer. The couple have two boys and a girl.

Media offices
Preceded by Tim Marshall	Diplomatic Editor of Sky News; 2015–present	Incumbent
