= James Longman =

English news correspondent

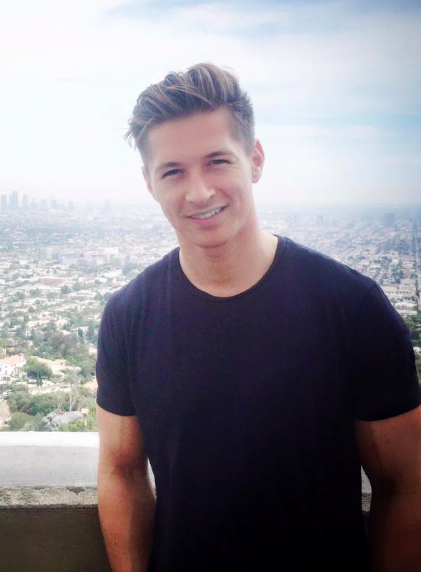
- Longman in 2015
- Born: 1986 (age 39–40); London, England, United Kingdom
- Education: Hill House School; Worth School
- Alma mater: School of Oriental and African Studies; London School of Economics
- Occupation: Journalist
- Employer: ABC News
- Spouse: Alex Brannan (m. 2022)
- Parent: John

James Longman (born 1986) is an English journalist and foreign correspondent for US network ABC News. Previously, he worked at the BBC where he worked as a general news reporter and the corporation's Beirut correspondent. Fluent in Arabic and French, he specialised in the Middle East, and regularly reports on issues around the refugee crisis and the Arab world, as well as terrorist incidents around Europe.

== Early life ==
Longman was born in 1986 in West London, and was raised in nearby Kensington. He is of partial Lebanese heritage through his grandmother, Gabriella Sawaya. At the age of nine on 3 October 1996, Longman's father John, who had schizophrenia, took his own life after setting his Notting Hill apartment on fire and jumped out the window afterward. He was educated at Hill House in Knightsbridge and at Worth School, a boarding school in West Sussex. He has a bachelor's degree in Arabic from the School of Oriental and African Studies, and a masters in Comparative Politics from the London School of Economics.

== Career ==
Longman started his career inside Syria, where he spent six months reporting for British newspapers, spending time in rebel-held areas in the lead-up to the Syrian Civil War. In 2012, he was hired by the BBC for his speciality in Syria.

He has taken a particular interest in mental health, and reported on his own family's history for the BBC's Victoria Derbyshire programme, where he was based in London.

In 2016, he ran the London Marathon in aid of Mind.

Since 2017 at ABC, he has travelled to over 50 countries on breaking news, as well as on features and news specials on all kinds of issues for ABC's Good Morning America, World News Tonight, and Nightline, as well as for National Geographic's Virus Hunters. Longman won the David Bloom award from the Radio and Television Correspondents Association and a Deadline Club award from the Society of Professional Journalists for his work in Chechnya, and won a News Emmy in 2021 for his work on the climate crisis in India, having also been nominated for his work in Thailand, Sri Lanka, Antarctica, and the Middle East. He was nominated for Young Talent of the Year at the 2016 Royal Television Society Awards.

== Personal life ==
Longman is gay. He proposed to his partner, Alex Brannan, in the summer of 2020, and the two married in July 2022.
