= Nigel Laughton =

English cricketer and sports consultant

Personal information
- Full name: Nigel Ewan Felix Laughton
- Born: 12 October 1965 (age 61); Aldershot, Hampshire, England
- Batting: Right-handed
- Bowling: Right-arm off break

Domestic team information
- Years: Team
- 1997: Oxford University

Career statistics
Competition	First-class
Matches	1
Runs scored	6
Batting average	3.00
100s/50s	–/–
Top score	5
Catches/stumpings	1/–
- Source: Cricinfo, 5 July 2020

Nigel Ewan Felix Laughton (born 12 October 1965) is an English sports consultant and a former first-class cricketer and British Army officer.

The son of Ronald Francis Gerard Laughton and Gillian Hazel Cocks, he was born at Aldershot in October 1965. After leaving Worth School, Laughton taught in Australia at Melbourne Grammar School for a year, before returning to England. After returning he undertook training for the British Army at the Royal Military Academy Sandhurst, being commissioned as a second lieutenant in the Black Watch in April 1986. He was promoted to lieutenant in April 1988, before being promoted to captain in April 1992. During his military career he toured Northern Ireland three times and became a helicopter pilot with the Army Air Corps. He was seriously injured in a helicopter crash in 1994, invalidating him out of the army due to the injuries he sustained.

After recovering from his accident, Laughton studied at Harris Manchester College at the University of Oxford. While studying at Oxford, he made a single appearance in first-class cricket for Oxford University against Durham at Oxford in 1997. Captaining the Oxford side, he was dismissed for 4 runs in their first innings by Neil Killeen, while in their second innings he was dismissed for a single run by James Boiling. After graduating from Oxford in 1997, he was appointed as the first development manager at the International Cricket Council, responsible primarily for developing the game in Europe. In 2001, he was appointed National Academy manager at the England and Wales Cricket Board and managed five England A tours.

In June 2006, he was appointed operations manager for Bath Rugby. Returning to cricket, he was appointed director and head of cricket by the Board of Control for Cricket in India for the Indian Premier League and held a similar position for the Champions League Twenty20, a tournament he helped to found. Laughton proceeded to manage the 2011 Cricket World Cup matches played in Bangladesh. He moved into sports consultancy and management in Olympic sports and was team leader for Team GB at the 2014 Winter Olympics in Sochi. In November 2014, he became chief executive of Pentathlon GB, though left the post in September 2015 citing significant differences between the board and Laughton.
