= Catholic Voices =

Catholic training project

Catholic Voices is a communications project to train ordinary Catholic men and women to speak on television and radio about controversial issues related to the Catholic Church. The project started in Britain in 2010 but has now spread to over 20 other countries.

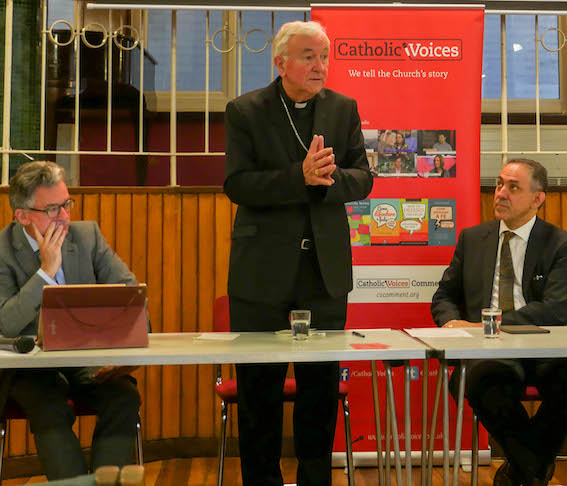
Austen Ivereigh and Jack Valero with Cardinal Vincent Nichols during a Catholic Voices event

== History ==
Catholic Voices was founded by Austen Ivereigh and Jack Valero in 2010 to prepare the State visit by Pope Benedict XVI to the United Kingdom in September of that year to beatify Cardinal John Henry Newman in Birmingham. The project had the blessing of the Catholic Archbishop of Westminster, Archbishop (later Cardinal) Vincent Nichols.

The announcement of Pope Benedict's visit in March 2010 caused controversy in Britain. Some people did not want the visit to take place or at least they thought the state should not pay for it. They considered that the views of Pope Benedict were not in line with modern British values. The areas mentioned included the clerical sex-abuse crisis, HIV/AIDS in Africa, gay rights, abortion and birth control, the role of women in the Church and in society, etc.

Ivereigh and Valero thought the controversy would be a good opportunity to explain the real position of the Catholic Church on all these various issues given that the media would want to hold the conversation between the protestors and the Church. They saw a need for Catholics to be well informed about the Church and its doctrines, and good in communicating these in modern media settings in the fast-moving 24-hour news cycle.

An October 2009 Intelligence Squared debate on “The Catholic Church is a force for good in the world” had been massively lost by the Catholic side, which convinced the project founders of the need for better trained speakers.

A call was put out for volunteers to be trained and 20 were selected from the more than 90 who applied to form part of the project. The training took place between March and July 2010, with the help of Kathleen Griffin, formerly a BBC producer for Woman's Hour, who joined Catholic Voices as a third coordinator. In early September, presentations were made to the BBC and other media companies, and a debate was held in Conway Hall between Catholic Voices and Humanists UK. As the visit approached, members of Catholic Voices were asked to comment on news stories related to the Papal Visit.

During the time of the Papal Visit 16–19 September 2010, members of Catholic Voices appeared in more than 100 news programmes. Despite some protests in Oxford Street, Pope Benedict’s visit was generally considered to have been a media success.

Soon after the Papal Visit, debates between Catholic Voices and Humanist groups took place in London. Catholic Voices continued to train groups of Catholics around the country and organise debates. In 2013, they held a public debate on same-sex marriage and in 2016 on Brexit. There were many media calls at the time of the Papal transition from Pope Benedict to Pope Francis in 2013. Many Catholic Voices TV appearances are included on their YouTube Channel.

Seeing what the project had achieved in the UK, groups of Catholic Voices started in over twenty other countries, including Ireland, Mexico and the USA, some of which are still active, such as Chile, Bolivia, Malta, and France. Ivereigh and Valero set up the groups but, once established, they have run as independent entities in each country. There is a meeting of Catholic Voices groups every two years in Rome.

== Communications method ==
The method of Catholic Voices is based on finding common ground, seeking the positive intention of the other in any discussion and starting the conversation from there.

It starts with what is called the “frame”, i.e. the set of assumptions and prejudices about a person or institution when there is a news story involving them. When the frame is strong, what people hear most of all is the frame. In that case, and if the frame is negative, the way the speaker talks about an issue will determine whether they reinforce the frame or step out of it. Only by stepping out of the negative frame will their message be heard. This is what has been called “reframing”: stepping out of the frame where one has been placed.

Once the frame is understood, the next step is to look for the common values, the things that all parties agree on, with the idea of starting the response from there.

The reframing process then has these three steps

- What is the frame? What do they think of me, of us?
- What is the positive intention or common ground between us? Of the several things the other side want, which ones do I totally agree with?
- What is my message and how do I connect it with the common value?

This method involves listening carefully to the other without assuming that one knows their intention. It also demands clear explanations on one’s own part so that the message can be understood. It has been summarised in the ten principles of communication of Catholic Voices.

The method has been found useful to debate controversial subjects such as abortion, same-sex unions, immigration, or gender identity issues. It is explained in detail in the book How to Defend the Faith Without Raising Your Voice, originally written in 2012 and revised and expanded in 2015. The book has been translated and adapted into Portuguese, French, Italian and Spanish. An Irish version has also been produced.
