= Michael Questier =

Michael C. Questier is an English academic and historian.

Questier studied at Worth School and Balliol College, Oxford. In 1991 he completed a D.Phil at the University of Sussex on early modern politico-religious history. He has published works on post-Reformation history, and English Catholicism between the early Reformation and the English Civil War, particularly focusing on anti-popery, aristocratic culture, the Jacobean exchequer, and the experience of conversion. He taught at Worcester College, Oxford, was a British Academy Postdoctoral Fellow at King's College London, and in 2002, became a senior lecturer at Queen Mary, University of London, subsequently becoming its Professor of Early Modern British and European History. He has also been a Visiting Fellow at All Souls College, Oxford.

== Published works ==
- "Conversion, Politics and Religion in England, 1580-1625", Cambridge Studies in Early Modern British History (1996) ISBN 0-521-44214-1
- The Politics of Religious Conformity and the Accession of James I, Article (2002) doi:10.1111/1468-2281.00051
- *Newsletters from the Caroline Court, 1631-1638: Volume 26: Catholicism and the Politics of the Personal Rule, Camden Fifth Series xvi+358 (2005) ISBN 0-521-85407-5
- "Elizabeth and the Catholics" in Catholics and the Protestant Nation: Religious Politics and Identity in Early Modern England, Manchester University Press, edited by E. Shagan, pp. 63–94 (2005)
- "Catholicism and Community in Early Modern England: Politics, Aristocratic Patronage and Religion, c.1550-1640", Cambridge Studies in Early Modern British History (2006) ISBN 0-521-86008-3
- "Arminianism, Catholicism and Puritanism in England during the 1630s", Historical Journal, 49, pp. 53–78 (2006) doi:10.1017/S0018246X05005054.
- "Catholic Loyalism in Early Stuart England", English Historical Review, cxxiii, pp. 1132–65 (2008)
- Stuart Dynastic Policy and Religious Politics, 1621-1625, Cambridge University Press for the Royal Historical Society (2009) ISBN 978-0-521-19403-7
- "Every inch a king?: The posthumous reputation of James VI and I" TLS, August 8, 2025.

== Co-authored published works ==
- England's long reformation, 1500-1800, Nicholas Tyacke UCL Press Ch 8, pp 195–225 (1998) with Professor Peter Lake. ISBN 1-85728-756-8 | ISBN 978-1-85728-756-1
- Newsletters from the Archpresbyterate of George Birkhead, Camden Fifth Series, (1999), with George Birkhead, ISBN 0-521-65260-X
- The Antichrist's Lewd Hat: Protestants, Papists and Players in Post-Reformation England, Yale University Press (2002), with Professor Peter Lake, ISBN 0-300-08884-1
- Conformity and Orthodoxy in the English Church, c.1560-1660, Studies in Modern British Religious History - Boydell and Brewer (2000), with Professor Peter Lake, ISBN 0-85115-797-1 | ISBN 978-0-85115-797-9
- The Trials of Margaret Clitherow: Persecution, Martyrdom and the Politics of Sanctity in Elizabethan England (2011) with Professor Peter Lake, ISBN 1-4411-0436-4 | ISBN 978-1-4411-0436-6
