= Estelle Paranque =

French public historian of England

Estelle Paranque FRHistS
- Education: Aix-Marseille University; University College London
- Employers: King's College London; University of Winchester; University College London; Queen Mary University of London; Northeastern University London; University of Warwick
- Children: 2
- Website: www.paranque.fr/estelle

Estelle Paranque FRHistS is a Franco-British public historian and Associate Professor in history based in London, specialising in early modern royalty, queenship and diplomacy. In addition to creating educational content, she has authored works, profiling the likes of Elizabeth I, Catherine de Medici, Louise of Lorraine, and Anne Boleyn, and contributed to a number of documentaries.

Paranque held academic positions at King's College London, the University of Winchester, before joining the New College of the Humanities (now Northeastern University London) and the University of Warwick in 2017.

== Early life and education ==
Paranque graduated with a Bachelor of Arts (BA) in English Studies and a Master in History from Aix-Marseille University and completed her PhD at University College London (UCL) in 2016.

== Career ==
Paranque started off teaching French at Queen Mary University of London before moving to King's College London (KCL) as an assistant. In 2015, she made her television debut in an installment of the France 2 documentary Secrets d'Histoire about Elizabeth I.

After completing her PhD in 2016, Paranque was promoted seminar leader of the Early Modern Britain course and guest lecturer at KCL. She also secured a position the University of Winchester as an associate lecturer of Introduction to Early Modern Europe. During this time, she co-edited her first essay collection with Nate Probasco and Claire Jowitt titled Colonisation, Piracy & Trade in Early Modern Europe: The Roles of Powerful Women and Queens, published in 2017 via Palgrave Macmillan.

In autumn 2017, Paranque joined the New College of the Humanities (NCH) as a Visiting Lecturer in Early Modern History in autumn 2017 and became an Honorary Research Fellow at the University of Warwick's Centre for the Study of the Renaissance. She has since become Associate Professor at the former (which is now part of Northeastern University London). Paranque next co-edited the 2018 volume Forgotten Queens in Medieval and Early Modern Europe: Political Agency, Myth-Making, and Patronage with Valerie Schutte.

Via Springer Nature and Palgrave Macmillan, Paranque published her PhD thesis as an academic monograph book titled Elizabeth I of England Through Valois Eyes: Power, Representation and Diplomacy in the Reign of the Queen, 1558-1588 in 2018.

Paranque featured in the 2021 BBC Two docuseries The Boleyns: A Scandalous Family, which also aired on PBS in the United States.

Announced in 2020, Ebury Press pre-empted the rights to publish Paranque's second book Blood, Fire and Gold: The Story of Elizabeth I and Catherine de Medici in 2022. Blood, Fire and Gold was named The Times Book of the Week and appeared on The Smithsonian's list of the 10 best history books of 2022.

In 2023, Paranque featured in and contributed to the first episode of the Channel 4 docuseries The Queens Who Changed the World.

Paranque reunited with Ebury Press for the publication of her third book Thorns, Lust, and Glory: The Betrayal of Anne Boleyn. The book examines Anne Boleyn's life over 20 years, with additional focus on her seven years spent as a young lady-in-waiting in France, and how she was viewed by French and Spanish sources. Paranque featured in the Gloucester History Festival that year.

As of 2024, Paranque was working with a team of computer scientists and historians to translate 50 of Mary Queen of Scots' letters, written in cipher characters.

== Bibliography ==
=== Books ===
- Elizabeth I of England Through Valois Eyes: Power, Representation and Diplomacy in the Reign of the Queen, 1558-1588 (2018)
- Blood, Fire and Gold: The Story of Elizabeth I and Catherine de Medici (2022)
- Thorns, Lust, and Glory: The Betrayal of Anne Boleyn (2024)

=== Edited books ===
- Colonisation, Piracy & Trade in Early Modern Europe: The Roles of Powerful Women and Queens (2017), co-edited with Nate Probasco and Claire Jowitt
- Forgotten Queens in Medieval and Early Modern Europe: Political Agency, Myth-Making, and Patronage (2018), co-edited with Valerie Schutte
- Remembering Queens and Kings of Early Modern England and France: Reputation, Reinterpretation, and Reincarnation (2019)

=== Articles and chapters ===
- "Catherine of Medici: Henry III's inspiration to be a Father to his People" in Royal Mothers and their Ruling Children: Wielding Political Authority from Antiquity to the Early Modern Era (2015), edited by Elena Woodacre and Carey Fleiner
- "The Representations and Ambiguities of the Warlike Female Kingship of Elizabeth I of England" in Medieval and Early Modern Representations of Authority in Scotland and Great Britain (2016), edited by Katherine Buchanan and Lucinda Dean
- "The Significance of the King's Children in The Tudors" with Carole Levin in The Tudors, Sex, Politics, and Power: History, Fiction and Artistic License in the Showtime Television Series (2016), edited by William B Robison
- "Another Spare to the French Crown: Henry III of France's Self-Representation and Royal Authority" in Unexpected Heirs in Early Modern Europe: Potential Kings and Queens (2017), edited by Valerie Schutte
- "Queen Elizabeth I and the Elizabethan Court in the French Ambassador's Eyes" in Queens Matter in Early Modern Studies: Essays in Honor of Professor Carole Levin (2017), edited by Anna Riehl Bertolet
- "Royal Representations Through the Warrior and Father Figures in Early Modern Europe" in History of Monarchy (2019), edited by Elena Woodacre
- "Catherine of Medici and her Grandmotherhood: Building Emotional and Political Intergenerational Relationships" in Renaissance Studies Journal, Vol 34:4 (2020)
- "Devotion, Influence, and Loyalty: Re-evaluating Queen Louise de Lorraine-Vaudémont's political and diplomatic role in early modern France" in Early Modern Women Journal, Vol 16.2 (2022)
