= Worth School =

Public school in West Sussex, England

Coordinates: 51°05′32″N 0°07′10″W

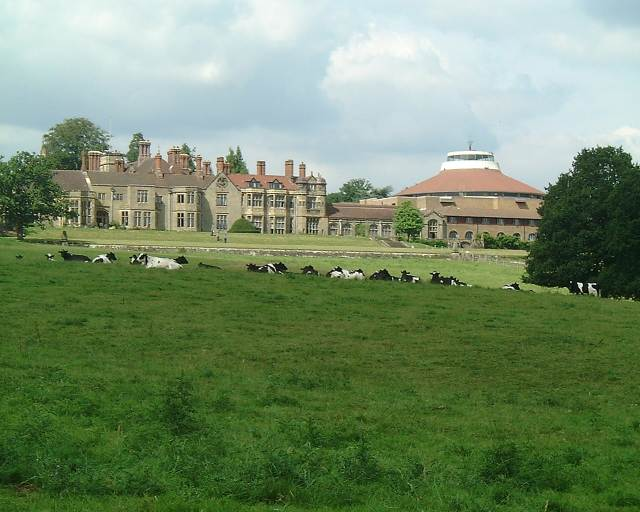

Location
- Paddockhurst Road; Turners Hill, West Sussex, RH10 4SD; England

Information
- Type: Private school Boarding school Day school
- Motto: Latin: Gloria Dei est homo bene vivit (The glory of God is a person fully alive)
- Religious affiliation: Roman Catholic
- Established: 1617 (In Douai); 1933 (Current location)
- Founder: John Chapman
- Department for Education URN: 126137 Tables
- Chair of the Governors: Sebastian Bailey
- Head: Ben Pennington
- Gender: Coeducational
- Age: 11 to 18
- Enrolment: 530
- Houses: 10
- Colours: Worth blue & gold
- Publication: Identity; Worth Knowing; The Blue Paper
- Alumni: Old Worthians
- Website: www.worthschool.org.uk

Worth School is a private co-educational Catholic boarding and day school for pupils from 11 to 18 years of age near Worth, West Sussex, England. Until 2008, Worth was exclusively a boys' school. The school is located within Worth Abbey, a Benedictine monastery, in 500 acres (2.0 km^{2}) of Sussex countryside. It is one of the three Benedictine independent boarding schools in the United Kingdom; the other two being Ampleforth and Downside. For the academic year 2015/16, Worth charged day pupils up to £7,275 per term, making it the 42nd most expensive HMC day school.

== History ==
In 1617 the Benedictine community of English and Welsh monks that had founded Downside School in Douai established a preparatory school to educate the younger pupils. At the time, both schools were located in France due to the severe penal laws in England imposed against Catholics. This way, English Catholics were able to send their children to study across the channel. After an incident with French revolutionaries in 1790, the school had to move back to England, where laws against Catholics had become more flexible. After several years in Acton Burnell, the monks finally settled in Stratton-on-the-Fosse, Somerset, in 1814; this is the current location of Downside School.

In 1933 the Paddockhurst country estate of Lord Cowdray was purchased by Downside Abbey. John Chapman, Abbot of Downside, relocated the junior school to the estate, thus establishing a preparatory school for boys aged 7 to 13 named Worth Priory. This school, set in the mansion house of Paddockhurst, was a junior school for Downside School. Having 60 pupils at foundation, numbers rose to 100 in 1939 when the school was evacuated and moved to Downside Abbey for the duration of the Second World War. In 1957 pupil numbers rose to 256.

In 1957 Worth Abbey became independent from Downside Abbey, and shortly after this a private senior school, Worth School, for boys aged 13 to 18, was founded (1959). The former Worth Preparatory School remained separate from the senior school and was progressively scaled-down until in 1965 it became The Junior House for boys aged 11 to 13.

Worth remained a purely boarding school until the 1990s, when day students were first admitted, and two day houses were founded, one inheriting the name of Worth's founder, Chapman, the other named for its first Abbot, Farwell. Worth was the first English Benedictine school to combine the boarding and day traditions in this way.

In October 1999 the School hosted the first International Conference on Benedictine Education. Over one hundred Benedictine educators, monks, nuns and lay people came from sixty Benedictine schools in fifteen countries to work together on developing the Benedictine tradition of education. At this meeting work began on establishing The International Commission on Benedictine Education (ICBE) which was founded in November 2002 to support those schools which promote a Benedictine vision of education.

In 2002 Worth School was established as a separate charity from Worth Abbey, with its own Board of Governors and a lay chairman.

Girls were accepted into the sixth form from September 2008. Girls were admitted into the lower years in 2010. A boarding house and a day house for girls were subsequently founded.

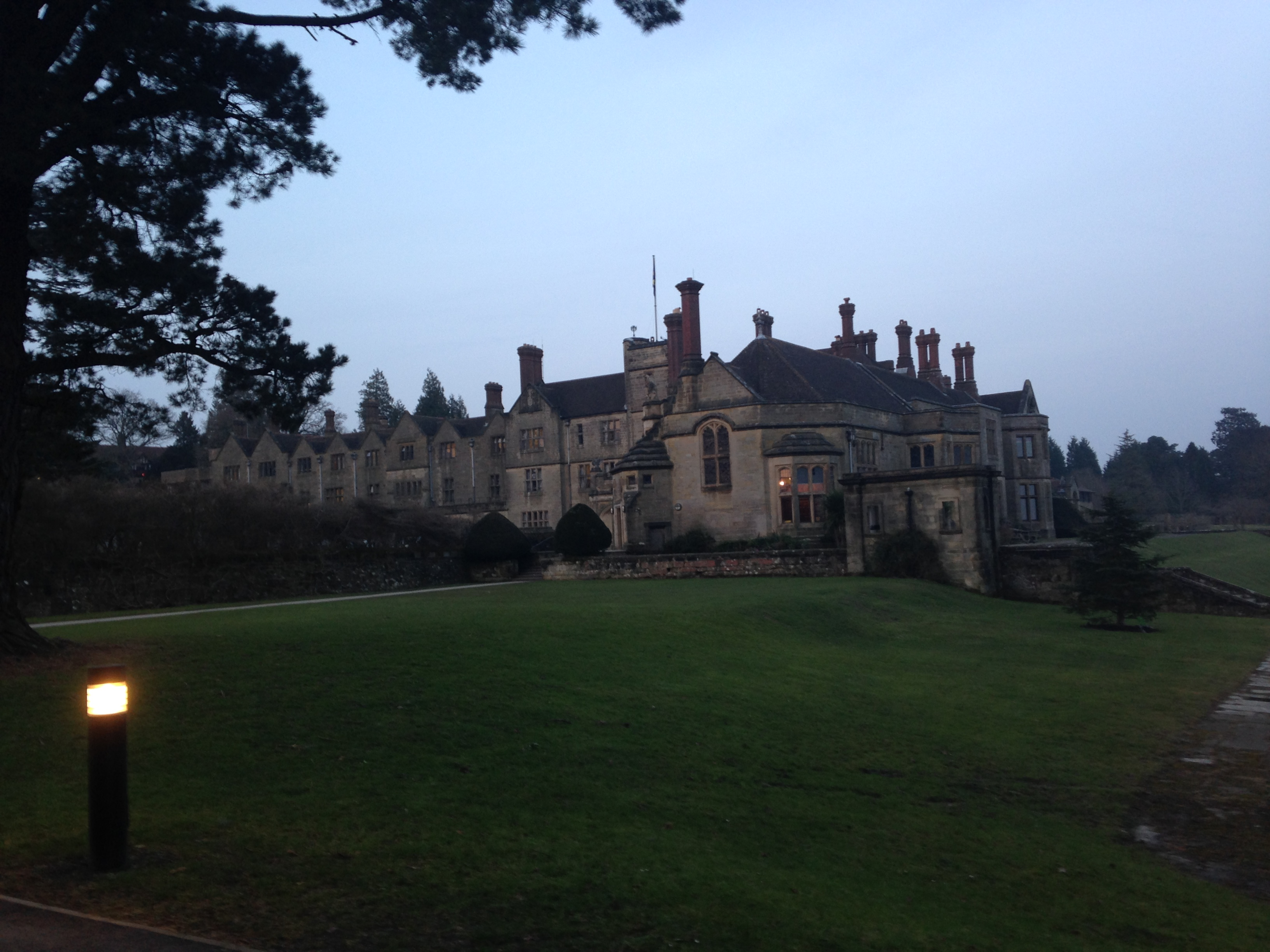
Main House at Worth School

In 2005 the Office of Fair Trading found fifty independent schools, including Worth, to have breached the Competition Act by "regularly and systematically" exchanging information about planned increases in school fees, which was collated and distributed among the schools by the bursar at Sevenoaks School. Following the investigation by the OFT, each school was required to pay around £70,000, totalling around £3.5 million, significantly less than the maximum possible fine. In addition, the schools together agreed to contribute another £3m to a new charitable educational fund. The incident raised concerns over whether the charitable status of independent schools such as Worth should be reconsidered, and perhaps revoked. However, Jean Scott, the head of the Independent Schools Council, said the schools were following a long-established procedure in sharing the information with each other because independent schools were previously exempt from anti-cartel rules applied to business and that they were unaware of the change to the law (on which they had not been consulted). She wrote to John Vickers, the OFT director-general, saying, "They are not a group of businessmen meeting behind closed doors to fix the price of their products to the disadvantage of the consumer. They are schools that have quite openly continued to follow a long-established practice because they were unaware that the law had changed."

In March 2009 the school celebrated its 75th anniversary, with a mass for the school community in Westminster Cathedral. The school was welcomed by Cardinal Cormac Murphy-O'Connor and the mass was celebrated in the presence of Archbishop Faustino Sainz Muñoz, Apostolic Nuncio to Great Britain. The school choir performed a specially composed motet by Colin Mawby, a former director of music at the cathedral.

In July 2009 racing driver Henry Surtees, age 18, had just finished his A-levels at Worth, when he died in an accident during a Formula Two race at Brands Hatch, Kent. The school commemorated this former pupil by naming a school social centre in his honour, and by a cross-Channel swim to raise £15,000 for Sussex Air Ambulance, the Surtees family's nominated charity.

During 2011 extended sports facilities were opened, including the school's first Astroturf. In the same year the Abbey Church, used daily by the school, was refurbished. The Abbey Church (constructed between 1965 and 1975) was designed by the English architect Francis Pollen, and "is considered by many to be the best example of his style". The refurbished interior, by Thomas Heatherwick Studios, won the West Sussex County Council Design and Sustainability Scheme Restoration Award for 2011. Judges found that "Thoughtful design and superb execution make for a wonderful restoration, proving that in the right hands contemporary architecture can be used to create an exceptional place for prayer and contemplation".

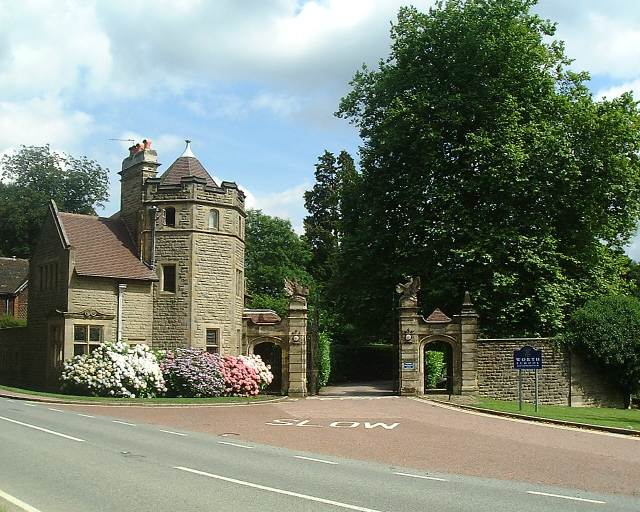
The school's entrance through Paddockhurst Road.

In November 2011 a 13-year-old pupil, William Avery-Wright, died in a road accident on the B2110 Paddockhurst Road while crossing unsupervised. His funeral was held in the Abbey Church in December of that year. Subsequently, the bereaved family have been critical of the school and in January 2014 the Conservative MP for Wealden, Charles Hendry, called for the resignation of the school's Headmaster, Gino Carminati, and Chair of Governors, Alda Andreotti.

In September 2012 a new building for the boys boarding house, St Bede's, was opened in a woodland setting near the school golf course. Designed by architects Miller Bourne (Hove), the building houses 60 boarders, along with a housemaster's family house and a flat for a residential tutor. The St Bede's building won the 2012 Sussex Heritage Trust Award in the large commercial category.

In June 2013 in co-operation with The Jesuit Institute, the school was host to an educational conference on the Identity and Mission of Catholic Schools. Attracting over 40 international participants, the two-day event focused on sustaining and developing the ethos of Catholic schools. This was the first time that schools in the UK from the Benedictine and Jesuit traditions of education had co-operated in such a manner. Later in the same year, the school opened a pedestrian footbridge across the B2110 Paddockhurst Road, better linking its main site with its nearby playing fields. Because the school is in the High Weald Area of Outstanding Natural Beauty the bridge was designed so that its impact is minimised.

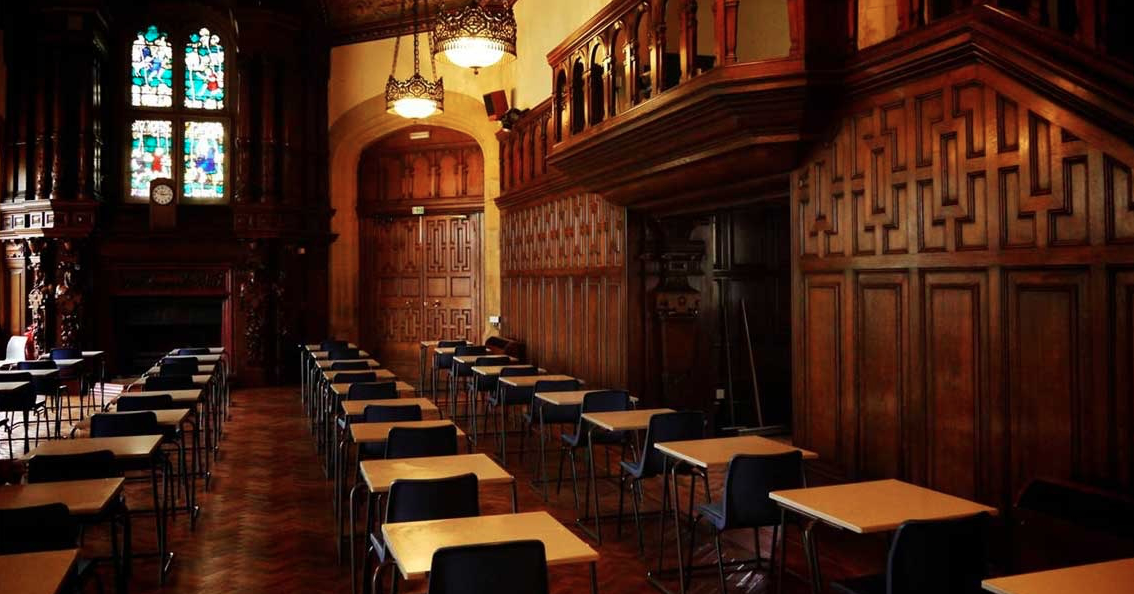
Detail of the Whitehead Room at Worth School.

In August 2015 Stuart McPherson (an Eton College former housemaster) assumed the leadership of the school community as head master. McPherson is the school's third lay Head Master, and, by co-incidence, its third Australian Head.

In 2017 the National College for Teaching and Leadership banned David Brown indefinitely from teaching. Brown, then a part-time singing teacher at the school had an affair with a sixth-form pupil in 2015. It was reported that Brown, had messaged the student encouraging her to take drugs in order to improve the sexual side of their relationship, and sending her images containing nudity.

In the summer of 2019 a former student, Michael Spencer, made a gift of £6.25 million for the school to build a new sixth form centre, which opened in April 2022. In July 2022, the building won a Sussex Heritage Trust award. In the summer of 2025, work was completed on a £2.5 million science extension, a project which includes three new science classrooms.

In October 2024, Worth was named Boarding School of the Year at the Independent Schools of the Year awards.

In November 2025, Ben Pennington was announced as the new Head from September 2026, replacing Stuart McPherson who left to become Head at Sydney Grammar School..

== Music ==
In 2014 Worth pupils gained places at the Junior Royal Academy of Music as well as an organ scholarship at Keble College, Oxford. In April 2016, the school's choir were the first to sing at a papal mass alongside the Sistine Chapel Choir. Thirty six pupils sang the liturgy celebrated by Pope Francis with a special focus on young people for the Jubilee Year of Mercy. The school's choir returned to Rome in July 2018 when they became the first school choir to sing alone in the Sistine Chapel.

== Media coverage ==
Although neither the school nor pupils were involved, the BBC documentary titled "The Monastery" was filmed in the abbey in 2005, and showed part of Worth's campus from the air in its introduction.

== Robert Whitehead ==
Robert Whitehead, inventor of the torpedo, built the school's clocktower and model farm, having thereafter a room named after him.

== Head Masters ==
The head master is a member of the Headmasters' and Headmistresses' Conference.

- Dom Austin Corney (1933–1936)
- Dom Oliver Brayden (1936–1940)
- Dom Maurice Bell (1940–1959)
- Dom Dominic Gaisford (1959–1976)
- Dom Kevin Taggart (1977–1983)
- Dom Stephen Ortiger (1983–1993)
- Dom Christopher Jamison (1994–2002)
- Peter Armstrong (2002–2007)
- Gino Carminati (2007–2015)
- Stuart McPherson (2015–2025)
- Marisa Bosa, Interim Head (January–September 2026)
- Ben Pennington (2026–)

== Houses ==
House	Age	Colours	Motto	Gender	Boarding/Day
Rutherford	Year 9–13	Burgundy & black	Latin: Milites Castelli Chartacei; Soldiers of the Paper Castle	M	Boarding
Butler	Year 9–13	Navy & pale blue	Latin: Omnia Possibilia Sunt Credenti; All things are possible to him that believes	M	Day
St. Bede's	Year 12–13	Dark green & old gold	Latin: Pax et veritas Peace and truth	M	Boarding
Gervase	Year 9–13	Green & yellow		M	Boarding
Chapman	Year 9–13	Red & yellow	Latin: Crescit sub pondere virtus Under the weight of growing strength	M	Day
Farwell	Year 9–13	Black & white	Latin: Per angusta ad augusta Against all odds	M	Day
St. Mary's	Year 9–13	Violet & lilac	Latin: Monstra te Esse Matrem; Show yourself to be our Mother	F	Boarding
St. Anne's	Year 9–13	Pale blue & sky blue	Latin: Gratiam et Sapientiam; Grace and Wisdom	F	Day
St. Catherine's	Year 9–13	Pearl mystic turquoise & mint	Latin: Studium et diligentia Effort and diligence	F	Day
Austin	Year 7–8	Blue & gold		M/F	Day

== Former pupils ==
Former pupils include Formula Two driver Henry Surtees, comedian Harry Enfield, actor Robert Bathurst, rugby union players Tom Mitchell (rugby union, born 1989) and Nick Walshe, executive Sir John Chisholm, baronet Sir Dermot de Trafford, humanitarian and diplomat Prince Dominique de La Rochefoucauld-Montbel, historian Michael Aris, antiques expert Philip Mould, and various members of the Zobel de Ayala family and Marcos family including Bongbong Marcos.

Old Worthian Tie: Navy with Worth blue and gold stripes.

== Notable staff ==
- Andrew Bertie: Teacher. On 12 August 2012 The Times of Malta reported that "The process for the beatification of the late Grand Master and Prince Fra' Andrew Willoughby Ninian Bertie is to begin in the coming months".
